= List of colors: N–Z =

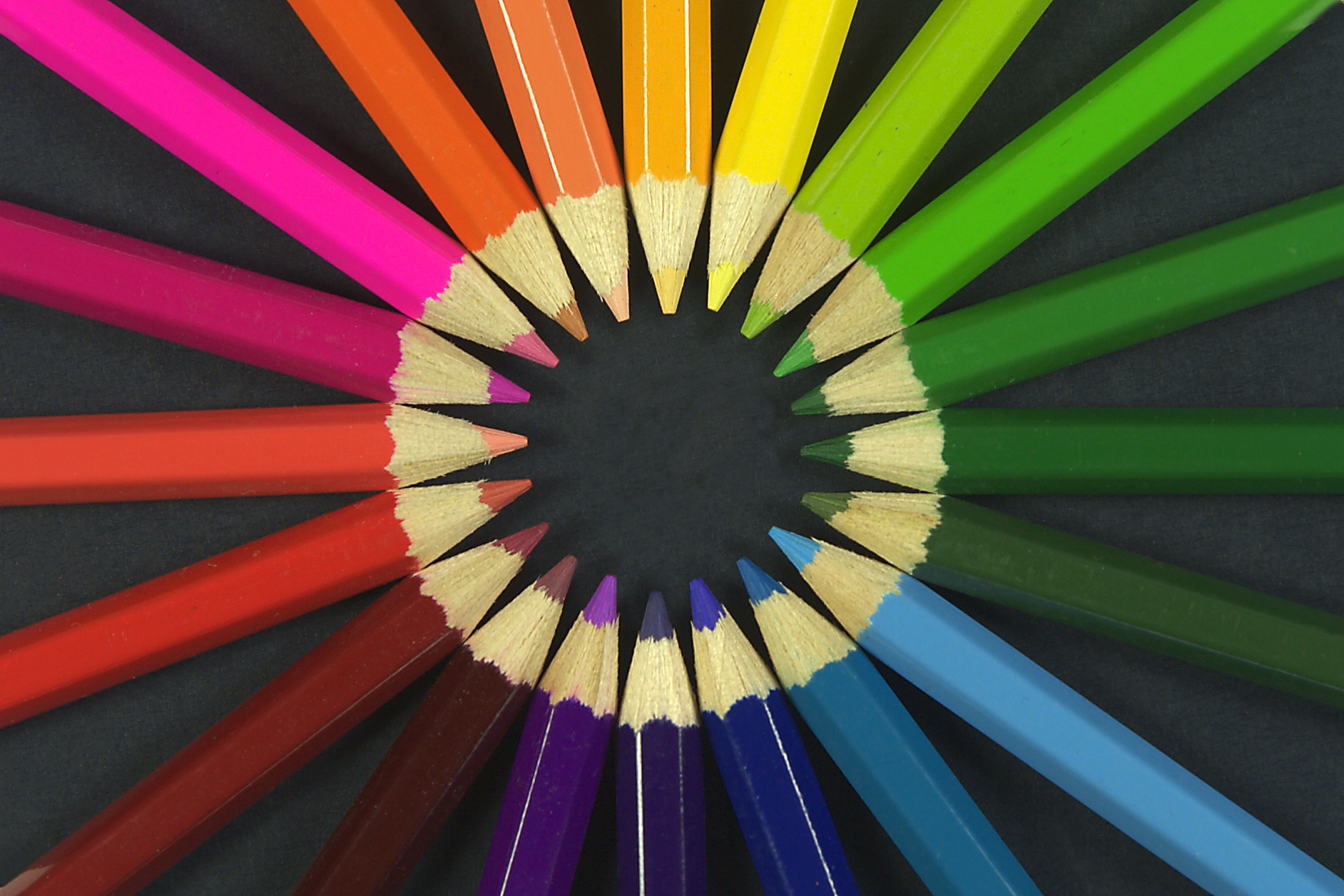
Colors are an important part of visual arts, fashion, interior design, and many other fields and disciplines.

The following is a list of colors. A number of the color swatches below are taken from domain-specific naming schemes such as X11 or HTML4. RGB values are given for each swatch because such standards are defined in terms of the sRGB color space. It is not possible to accurately convert many of these swatches to CMYK values because of the differing gamuts of the two spaces, but the color management systems built into operating systems and image editing software attempt such conversions as accurately as possible.

The HSV (hue, saturation, value) color space values, also known as HSB (hue, saturation, brightness), and the hex triplets (for HTML web colors) are also given in the following table. Some environments (like Microsoft Excel) reverse the order of bytes in hex color values (i.e. to "BGR"). Colors that appear on the web-safe color palette—which includes the sixteen named colors—are noted. (Those four named colors corresponding to the neutral greys have no hue value, which is effectively ignored—i.e., left blank.)

== Colors in alphabetical order N–Z ==
Colors
Name	Hex (RGB)	Red (RGB)	Green (RGB)	Blue (RGB)	Hue (HSL/HSV)	Satur. (HSL)	Light (HSL)	Satur. (HSV)	Value (HSV)
Nadeshiko pink	#F6ADC6	96%	68%	78%	339°	80%	82%	80%	82%
Naples yellow	#FADA5E	98%	85%	37%	48°	94%	67%	62%	98%
Navajo white	#FFDEAD	100%	87%	68%	36°	100%	84%	32%	100%
Navy blue	#000080	0%	0%	50%	240°	100%	25%	100%	50%
Navy blue (Crayola)	#1974D2	10%	45%	82%	210°	79%	46%	88%	82%
Neon blue	#4666FF	27%	40%	100%	230°	100%	64%	73%	100%
Neon green	#39FF14	22%	100%	8%	111°	100%	54%	92%	100%
Neon fuchsia	#FE4164	100%	25%	39%	349°	99%	63%	74%	100%
New Car	#214FC6	13%	31%	78%	223°	71%	45%	83%	78%
New York pink	#D7837F	84%	51%	50%	3°	52%	67%	41%	84%
Nickel	#727472	45%	45%	45%	120°	1%	45%	2%	46%
Non-photo blue	#A4DDED	64%	87%	93%	193°	67%	79%	31%	93%
Nyanza	#E9FFDB	91%	100%	86%	97°	100%	93%	14%	100%
Ocher (Ochre)	#CC7722	80%	47%	13%	30°	71%	47%	83%	80%
Old burgundy	#43302E	26%	19%	18%	6°	19%	22%	31%	26%
Old gold	#CFB53B	81%	71%	23%	49°	61%	52%	71%	81%
Old lace	#FDF5E6	99%	96%	90%	39°	85%	95%	9%	99%
Old lavender	#796878	47%	41%	47%	304°	8%	44%	14%	47%
Old mauve	#673147	40%	19%	28%	336°	36%	30%	52%	40%
Old rose	#C08081	75%	50%	51%	359°	34%	63%	33%	75%
Old silver	#848482	52%	52%	51%	60°	1%	51%	2%	52%
Olive	#808000	50%	50%	0%	60°	100%	25%	100%	50%
Olive Drab (#3)	#6B8E23	42%	56%	14%	80°	61%	35%	75%	56%
Olive Drab #7	#3C341F	24%	20%	12%	43°	32%	18%	48%	24%
Olive green	#B5B35C	71%	70%	36%	59°	38%	54%	49%	71%
Olivine	#9AB973	60%	73%	45%	87°	33%	59%	38%	73%
Onyx	#353839	21%	22%	22%	195°	4%	22%	7%	22%
Opal	#A8C3BC	66%	76%	74%	164°	18%	71%	14%	76%
Opera mauve	#B784A7	72%	52%	65%	319°	26%	62%	28%	72%
Orange	#FF8000	100%	50%	0%	30°	100%	50%	100%	100%
Orange (Crayola)	#FF7538	100%	46%	22%	18°	100%	61%	78%	100%
Orange (Pantone)	#FF5800	100%	35%	0%	21°	100%	50%	100%	100%
Orange (web)	#FFA500	100%	65%	0%	39°	100%	50%	100%	100%
Orange peel	#FF9F00	100%	62%	0%	37°	100%	50%	100%	100%
Orange-red	#FF681F	100%	41%	12%	20°	100%	56%	88%	100%
Orange-red (Crayola)	#FF5349	100%	33%	29%	4°	100%	64%	71%	100%
Orange soda	#FA5B3D	98%	36%	24%	10°	95%	61%	76%	98%
Orange-yellow	#F5BD1F	96%	74%	12%	44°	92%	54%	87%	96%
Orange-yellow (Crayola)	#F8D568	97%	84%	41%	45°	91%	69%	58%	97%
Orchid	#DA70D6	85%	44%	84%	302°	59%	65%	49%	85%
Orchid pink	#F2BDCD	95%	74%	80%	342°	67%	85%	22%	95%
Orchid (Crayola)	#E29CD2	89%	61%	82%	314°	55%	75%	31%	89%
Outer space (Crayola)	#2D383A	18%	22%	23%	189°	13%	20%	22%	23%
Outrageous Orange	#FF6E4A	100%	43%	29%	12°	100%	65%	71%	100%
Oxblood	#4A0000	29%	0%	0%	0°	100%	15%	100%	29%
Oxford blue	#002147	0%	13%	28%	212°	100%	14%	100%	28%
OU Crimson red	#841617	52%	9%	9%	360°	71%	30%	83%	52%
Pacific blue	#1CA9C9	11%	66%	79%	191°	76%	45%	86%	79%
Pakistan green	#006600	0%	40%	0%	120°	100%	20%	100%	40%
Palatinate purple	#682860	41%	16%	38%	308°	44%	28%	62%	41%
Pale aqua	#BED3E5	75%	83%	90%	208°	43%	84%	17%	90%
Pale cerulean	#9BC4E2	61%	77%	89%	205°	55%	75%	31%	89%
Pale Dogwood	#ED7A9B	93%	48%	61%	334°	76%	70%	48%	92%
Pale pink	#FADADD	98%	85%	87%	354°	76%	92%	13%	98%
Pale purple (Pantone)	#FAE6FA	98%	90%	98%	300°	67%	94%	8%	98%
Pale spring bud	#ECEBBD	93%	92%	74%	59°	55%	83%	20%	93%
Pansy purple	#78184A	47%	9%	29%	329°	67%	28%	80%	47%
Paolo Veronese green	#009B7D	0%	61%	49%	168°	100%	30%	100%	61%
Papaya whip	#FFEFD5	100%	94%	84%	37°	100%	92%	16%	100%
Paradise pink	#E63E62	90%	24%	38%	347°	77%	57%	73%	90%
Parchment	#F1E9D2	95%	91%	82%	45°	53%	88%	13%	95%
Paris Green	#50C878	31%	78%	47%	140°	52%	55%	60%	78%
Pastel pink	#DEA5A4	87%	65%	64%	1°	47%	76%	26%	87%
Patriarch	#800080	50%	0%	50%	300°	100%	25%	100%	50%
Paua	#1F005E	12%	0%	37%	260°	100%	18%	100%	37%
Payne's grey	#536878	33%	41%	47%	206°	18%	40%	31%	47%
Peach	#FFE5B4	100%	90%	71%	39°	100%	85%	29%	100%
Peach (Crayola)	#FFCBA4	100%	80%	64%	26°	100%	82%	36%	100%
Peach puff	#FFDAB9	100%	85%	73%	28°	100%	86%	27%	100%
Pear	#D1E231	82%	89%	19%	66°	75%	54%	78%	89%
Pearly purple	#B768A2	72%	41%	64%	316°	35%	56%	43%	72%
Periwinkle	#CCCCFF	80%	80%	100%	240°	100%	90%	20%	100%
Periwinkle (Crayola)	#C3CDE6	76%	80%	90%	223°	41%	83%	15%	90%
Permanent Geranium Lake	#E12C2C	88%	17%	17%	0°	75%	53%	80%	88%
Persian blue	#1C39BB	11%	22%	73%	229°	74%	42%	85%	73%
Persian green	#00A693	0%	65%	58%	173°	100%	33%	100%	65%
Persian indigo	#32127A	20%	7%	48%	258°	74%	27%	85%	48%
Persian orange	#D99058	85%	56%	35%	26°	63%	60%	59%	85%
Persian pink	#F77FBE	97%	50%	75%	329°	88%	73%	49%	97%
Persian plum	#701C1C	44%	11%	11%	0°	60%	27%	75%	44%
Persian red	#CC3333	80%	20%	20%	0°	60%	50%	75%	80%
Persian rose	#FE28A2	100%	16%	64%	326°	99%	58%	84%	100%
Persimmon	#EC5800	93%	35%	0%	22°	100%	46%	100%	93%
Petunia	#470659	28%	2%	35%	287°	87%	19%	93%	35%
Pewter Blue	#8BA8B7	55%	66%	72%	200°	23%	63%	24%	72%
Phlox	#DF00FF	87%	0%	100%	292°	100%	50%	100%	100%
Phthalo blue	#000F89	0%	6%	54%	233°	100%	27%	100%	54%
Phthalo green	#123524	7%	21%	14%	151°	49%	14%	66%	21%
Picotee blue	#2E2787	18%	15%	53%	244°	55%	34%	71%	53%
Pictorial carmine	#C30B4E	76%	4%	31%	338°	89%	40%	94%	76%
Piggy pink	#FDDDE6	99%	87%	90%	343°	89%	93%	13%	99%
Pine green	#01796F	0%	47%	44%	175°	98%	24%	99%	47%
Pine green	#2A2F23	16%	18%	14%	85°	15%	16%	26%	18%
Pink	#FF80C0	100%	50%	75%	330°	100%	75%	50%	100%
Pink (web)	#FFC0CB	100%	75%	80%	350°	100%	88%	25%	100%
Pink (Pantone)	#D74894	84%	28%	58%	328°	64%	56%	67%	84%
Pink lace	#FFDDF4	100%	87%	96%	319°	100%	93%	13%	100%
Pink lavender	#D8B2D1	85%	70%	82%	311°	33%	77%	18%	85%
Pink Sherbet	#F78FA7	97%	56%	65%	346°	87%	76%	42%	97%
Pistachio	#93C572	58%	77%	45%	96°	42%	61%	42%	77%
Platinum	#E5E4E2	90%	89%	89%	40°	6%	89%	1%	90%
Plum	#8E4585	56%	27%	52%	307°	35%	41%	51%	56%
Plum (web)	#DDA0DD	87%	63%	87%	300°	47%	75%	28%	87%
Plump Purple	#5946B2	35%	27%	70%	251°	44%	49%	61%	70%
Polished Pine	#5DA493	36%	64%	58%	166°	28%	50%	43%	64%
Pomp and Power	#86608E	53%	38%	56%	290°	19%	47%	32%	56%
Popstar	#BE4F62	75%	31%	38%	350°	46%	53%	58%	75%
Portland Orange	#FF5A36	100%	35%	21%	11°	100%	61%	79%	100%
Powder blue	#B0E0E6	69%	88%	90%	187°	52%	80%	23%	90%
Prairie gold	#E1CA7A	88%	79%	48%	47°	63%	84%	46%	88%
Princeton orange	#F58025	96%	50%	15%	26°	91%	55%	85%	96%
Process Cyan	#00B9F2	0%	73%	95%	73°	100%	55%	0%	0%
Prune	#701C1C	44%	11%	11%	0°	60%	27%	75%	44%
Prussian blue	#003153	0%	19%	33%	205°	100%	16%	100%	33%
Psychedelic purple	#DF00FF	87%	0%	100%	292°	100%	50%	100%	100%
Puce	#CC8899	80%	53%	60%	345°	40%	67%	33%	80%
Pullman Brown (UPS Brown)	#644117	39%	25%	9%	33°	63%	24%	77%	39%
Pumpkin	#FF7518	100%	46%	9%	24°	100%	55%	91%	100%
Purple	#6A0DAD	38%	0%	50%	275°	100%	37%	92%	68%
Purple (web)	#800080	50%	0%	50%	300°	100%	25%	100%	50%
Purple (Munsell)	#9F00C5	62%	0%	77%	288°	100%	39%	100%	77%
Purple (X11)	#A020F0	63%	13%	94%	277°	87%	53%	87%	94%
Purple mountain majesty	#9678B6	59%	47%	71%	269°	30%	59%	34%	71%
Purple navy	#4E5180	31%	32%	50%	236°	24%	40%	39%	50%
Purple pizzazz	#FE4EDA	100%	31%	85%	312°	99%	65%	69%	100%
Purple Plum	#9C51B6	61%	32%	71%	285°	41%	52%	56%	71%
Queen blue	#436B95	26%	42%	58%	211°	38%	42%	55%	58%
Queen pink	#E8CCD7	91%	80%	84%	336°	38%	85%	12%	91%
Quick Silver	#A6A6A6	65%	65%	65%	—°	0%	65%	0%	65%
Quinacridone magenta	#8E3A59	56%	23%	35%	338°	42%	39%	59%	56%
Radical Red	#FF355E	100%	21%	37%	348°	100%	60%	79%	100%
Raisin black	#242124	14%	13%	14%	300°	4%	14%	8%	14%
Rajah	#FBAB60	98%	67%	38%	29°	95%	68%	62%	98%
Raspberry	#E30B5D	89%	4%	36%	337°	91%	47%	95%	89%
Raspberry glacé	#915F6D	57%	37%	43%	343°	21%	47%	34%	57%
Raspberry rose	#B3446C	70%	27%	42%	338°	45%	48%	62%	70%
Raw sienna	#D68A59	84%	54%	35%	24°	60%	59%	58%	84%
Raw umber	#826644	51%	40%	27%	33°	31%	39%	48%	51%
Razzle dazzle rose	#FF33CC	100%	20%	80%	315°	100%	60%	80%	100%
Razzmatazz	#E3256B	89%	15%	42%	338°	77%	52%	84%	89%
Razzmic Berry	#8D4E85	55%	31%	52%	308°	29%	43%	45%	55%
Rebecca Purple	#663399	40%	20%	60%	270°	49%	40%	67%	60%
Red	#FF0000	100%	0%	0%	0°	100%	50%	100%	100%
Red (Crayola)	#EE204D	93%	13%	30%	347°	86%	53%	87%	93%
Red (Munsell)	#F2003C	95%	0%	24%	345°	100%	47%	100%	95%
Red (NCS)	#C40233	77%	1%	20%	345°	98%	39%	99%	77%
Red (Pantone)	#ED2939	93%	16%	22%	355°	85%	55%	83%	93%
Red (pigment)	#ED1C24	93%	11%	14%	358°	85%	52%	88%	93%
Red (RYB)	#FE2712	100%	15%	7%	5°	99%	53%	93%	100%
Red-orange	#FF5349	100%	33%	29%	3°	100%	64%	71%	100%
Red ocher (Red ochre)	#913831	57%	22%	19%	4°	50%	38%	49%	57%
Red-orange (Crayola)	#FF681F	100%	41%	12%	20°	100%	56%	88%	100%
Red-orange (Color wheel)	#FF4500	100%	27%	0%	16°	100%	50%	100%	100%
Red-purple	#E40078	89%	0%	47%	328°	100%	45%	100%	89%
Red Salsa	#FD3A4A	99%	23%	29%	355°	98%	61%	77%	99%
Red-violet	#C71585	78%	8%	52%	322°	81%	43%	89%	78%
Red-violet (Crayola)	#C0448F	75%	27%	56%	324°	50%	51%	65%	75%
Red-violet (Color wheel)	#922B3E	57%	17%	24%	350°	55%	37%	71%	57%
Redwood	#A45A52	64%	35%	32%	6°	33%	48%	50%	64%
Resolution blue	#002387	0%	14%	53%	224°	100%	26%	100%	53%
Rhythm	#777696	47%	46%	59%	242°	13%	53%	21%	59%
Rich black	#004040	0%	25%	25%	180°	100%	13%	100%	25%
Rich black (FOGRA29)	#010B13	0%	4%	7%	207°	90%	4%	95%	8%
Rich black (FOGRA39)	#010203	0%	1%	1%	210°	50%	1%	67%	1%
Rifle green	#444C38	27%	30%	22%	84°	15%	26%	26%	30%
Robin egg blue	#00CCCC	0%	80%	80%	180°	100%	40%	100%	80%
Rocket metallic	#8A7F80	54%	50%	50%	355°	5%	52%	8%	54%
Rojo Spanish red	#A91101	66%	7%	0%	6°	99%	33%	99%	66%
Roman silver	#838996	51%	54%	59%	221°	8%	55%	13%	59%
Rose	#FF0080	100%	0%	50%	330°	100%	50%	100%	100%
Rose bonbon	#F9429E	98%	26%	62%	330°	94%	62%	73%	98%
Rose Dust	#9E5E6F	62%	37%	44%	344°	25%	49%	41%	62%
Rose ebony	#674846	40%	28%	27%	4°	19%	34%	32%	40%
Rose madder	#E32636	89%	15%	21%	355°	77%	52%	83%	89%
Rose pink	#FF66CC	100%	40%	80%	320°	100%	70%	60%	100%
Rose Pompadour	#ED7A9B	93%	48%	61%	334°	76%	70%	48%	92%
Rose red	#C21E56	76%	12%	34%	340°	73%	44%	85%	76%
Rose taupe	#905D5D	56%	36%	36%	0°	22%	46%	35%	56%
Rose vale	#AB4E52	67%	31%	32%	357°	37%	49%	54%	67%
Rosewood	#65000B	40%	0%	4%	353°	100%	20%	100%	40%
Rosso corsa	#D40000	83%	0%	0%	0°	100%	42%	100%	83%
Rosy brown	#BC8F8F	74%	56%	56%	0°	25%	65%	24%	74%
Royal blue (dark)	#002366	0%	14%	40%	219°	100%	20%	100%	40%
Royal blue (light)	#4169E1	25%	41%	88%	225°	73%	57%	71%	88%
Royal purple	#7851A9	47%	32%	66%	267°	35%	49%	52%	66%
Royal yellow	#FADA5E	98%	85%	37%	48°	94%	67%	62%	98%
Ruber	#CE4676	81%	27%	46%	339°	58%	54%	66%	81%
Rubine red	#D10056	82%	0%	34%	335°	100%	41%	100%	82%
Ruby	#E0115F	88%	7%	37%	337°	86%	47%	92%	88%
Ruby red	#9B111E	61%	7%	12%	354°	80%	34%	89%	61%
Rufous	#A81C07	66%	11%	3%	8°	92%	34%	96%	66%
Russet	#80461B	50%	27%	11%	26°	65%	30%	79%	50%
Russian green	#679267	40%	57%	40%	120°	17%	49%	29%	57%
Russian violet	#32174D	20%	9%	30%	270°	54%	20%	70%	30%
Rust	#B7410E	72%	25%	5%	18°	86%	39%	92%	72%
Rusty red	#DA2C43	85%	17%	26%	352°	70%	51%	80%	85%
Sacramento State green	#043927	2%	22%	15%	160°	87%	12%	93%	22%
Saddle brown	#8B4513	55%	27%	7%	25°	76%	31%	86%	55%
Safety orange	#FF7800	100%	47%	0%	28°	100%	50%	100%	100%
Safety orange (blaze orange)	#FF6700	100%	40%	0%	24°	100%	50%	100%	100%
Safety yellow	#EED202	93%	82%	1%	53°	98%	47%	99%	93%
Saffron	#F4C430	96%	77%	19%	45°	90%	57%	80%	96%
Sage	#BCB88A	74%	72%	54%	55°	27%	64%	27%	74%
St. Patrick's blue	#23297A	14%	16%	48%	236°	55%	31%	71%	48%
Salmon	#FA8072	98%	50%	45%	6°	93%	71%	54%	98%
Salmon pink	#FF91A4	100%	57%	64%	350°	100%	78%	43%	100%
Sand	#C2B280	76%	70%	50%	45°	35%	63%	34%	76%
Sand dune	#967117	59%	44%	9%	43°	73%	34%	85%	59%
Sandy brown	#F4A460	96%	64%	38%	28°	87%	67%	61%	96%
Sap green	#507D2A	31%	49%	16%	93°	50%	33%	66%	49%
Sapphire	#0F52BA	6%	32%	73%	216°	85%	39%	92%	73%
Sapphire blue	#0067A5	0%	40%	65%	203°	100%	32%	100%	65%
Sapphire (Crayola)	#2D5DA1	18%	36%	63%	215°	56%	40%	72%	35%
Satin sheen gold	#CBA135	80%	63%	21%	43°	59%	50%	74%	80%
Scarlet	#FF2400	100%	14%	0%	8°	100%	50%	100%	100%
Schauss pink	#FF91AF	100%	57%	69%	344°	100%	78%	43%	100%
School bus yellow	#FFD800	100%	85%	0%	51°	100%	50%	100%	100%
Screamin' Green	#66FF66	40%	100%	40%	120°	100%	70%	60%	100%
Sea green	#2E8B57	18%	55%	34%	146°	50%	36%	67%	55%
Sea green (Crayola)	#00FFCD	0%	100%	80%	168°	100%	50%	100%	100%
Seance	#612086	38%	13%	53%	278°	61%	33%	76%	53%
Seal brown	#59260B	20%	8%	8%	0°	43%	14%	60%	20%
Seashell	#FFF5EE	100%	96%	93%	25°	100%	97%	7%	100%
Secret	#764374	46%	26%	45%	302°	28%	36%	43%	46%
Selective yellow	#FFBA00	100%	73%	0%	44°	100%	50%	100%	100%
Sepia	#704214	44%	26%	8%	30°	70%	26%	82%	44%
Shadow	#8A795D	54%	47%	36%	37°	20%	45%	33%	54%
Shadow blue	#778BA5	47%	55%	65%	214°	20%	56%	28%	65%
Shamrock green	#009E60	0%	62%	38%	156°	100%	31%	100%	62%
Sheen green	#8FD400	56%	83%	0%	80°	100%	42%	100%	83%
Shimmering Blush	#D98695	85%	53%	58%	349°	52%	69%	38%	85%
Shiny Shamrock	#5FA778	37%	65%	47%	141°	29%	51%	43%	66%
Shocking pink	#FC0FC0	99%	6%	75%	315°	98%	52%	94%	99%
Shocking pink (Crayola)	#FF6FFF	100%	44%	100%	300°	100%	72%	56%	100%
Sienna	#882D17	53%	18%	9%	12°	71%	31%	83%	53%
Silver	#C0C0C0	75%	75%	75%	—°	0%	75%	0%	75%
Silver (Crayola)	#C9C0BB	79%	75%	73%	21°	12%	76%	7%	79%
Silver (Metallic)	#AAA9AD	67%	66%	68%	255°	2%	67%	2%	68%
Silver chalice	#ACACAC	67%	67%	67%	—°	0%	67%	0%	67%
Silver pink	#C4AEAD	77%	68%	68%	3°	16%	72%	12%	77%
Silver sand	#BFC1C2	75%	76%	76%	200°	2%	75%	2%	76%
Sinopia	#CB410B	80%	25%	4%	17°	90%	42%	95%	80%
Sizzling Red	#FF3855	100%	22%	33%	351°	100%	61%	78%	100%
Sizzling Sunrise	#FFDB00	100%	86%	0%	52°	100%	50%	100%	100%
Skobeloff	#007474	0%	45%	45%	180°	100%	23%	100%	45%
Skin color	#FFDEAD	100%	87%	68%	36°	100%	84%	32%	100%
Sky blue	#87CEEB	53%	81%	92%	197°	71%	73%	43%	92%
Sky blue (Crayola)	#76D7EA	46%	84%	92%	190°	73%	69%	50%	92%
Sky magenta	#CF71AF	81%	44%	69%	320°	50%	63%	45%	81%
Slate blue	#6A5ACD	42%	35%	80%	248°	54%	58%	56%	80%
Slate gray	#708090	44%	50%	56%	210°	13%	50%	22%	56%
Slimy green	#299617	16%	59%	9%	111°	73%	34%	85%	59%
Smitten	#C84186	78%	25%	53%	329°	55%	52%	68%	78%
Smoky black	#100C08	6%	5%	3%	30°	33%	5%	50%	6%
Snow	#FFFAFA	100%	98%	98%	0°	100%	99%	2%	76%
Solid pink	#893843	54%	22%	26%	352°	42%	38%	59%	54%
Sonic silver	#757575	46%	46%	46%	—°	0%	46%	0%	46%
Space cadet	#1D2951	11%	16%	32%	226°	47%	22%	64%	32%
Spanish bistre	#807532	50%	46%	20%	52°	44%	35%	61%	50%
Spanish blue	#0070B8	0%	44%	72%	203°	100%	36%	100%	72%
Spanish carmine	#D10047	82%	0%	28%	340°	100%	41%	100%	82%
Spanish gray	#989898	60%	60%	60%	—°	0%	60%	0%	60%
Spanish green	#009150	0%	57%	31%	153°	100%	28%	100%	57%
Spanish orange	#E86100	91%	38%	0%	25°	100%	45%	100%	91%
Spanish pink	#F7BFBE	97%	75%	75%	1°	78%	86%	23%	97%
Spanish red	#E60026	90%	0%	15%	350°	100%	45%	100%	90%
Spanish sky blue	#00FFFE	0%	100%	100%	180°	100%	50%	100%	100%
Spanish violet	#4C2882	30%	16%	51%	264°	53%	33%	69%	51%
Spanish viridian	#007F5C	0%	50%	36%	163°	100%	25%	100%	50%
Spring bud	#A7FC00	65%	99%	0%	80°	100%	49%	100%	99%
Spring Frost	#87FF2A	53%	100%	16%	94°	100%	58%	84%	100%
Spring green	#00FF80	0%	100%	50%	150°	100%	50%	100%	100%
Spring green (Crayola)	#ECEBBD	93%	92%	74%	59°	55%	83%	20%	93%
Star command blue	#007BB8	0%	48%	72%	200°	100%	36%	100%	72%
Steel blue	#4682B4	27%	51%	71%	207°	44%	49%	61%	71%
Steel pink	#CC33CC	80%	20%	80%	300°	60%	50%	75%	80%
Stil de grain yellow	#FADA5E	98%	85%	37%	48°	94%	67%	62%	98%
Straw	#E4D96F	89%	85%	44%	54°	68%	66%	51%	89%
Strawberry	#FA5053	98%	31%	33%	359°	94%	65%	68%	98%
Strawberry Blonde	#FF9361	100%	58%	38%	19°	100%	69%	62%	100%
Strong Lime Green	#33CC33	20%	80%	20%	120°	60%	69%	62%	100%
Sugar Plum	#914E75	57%	31%	46%	325°	30%	44%	46%	57%
Sunglow	#FFCC33	100%	80%	20%	45°	100%	60%	80%	100%
Sunray	#E3AB57	89%	67%	34%	36°	71%	62%	62%	89%
Sunset	#FAD6A5	98%	84%	65%	35°	90%	81%	34%	98%
Super pink	#CF6BA9	81%	42%	66%	323°	51%	62%	48%	81%
Sweet Brown	#A83731	66%	22%	19%	3°	55%	43%	71%	66%
Syracuse Orange	#D44500	83%	27%	0%	9°	100%	42%	72%	100%
Tan	#D2B48C	82%	71%	55%	25°	44%	69%	33%	82%
Tan (Crayola)	#D99A6C	85%	60%	42%	34°	59%	64%	50%	85%
Tangerine	#F28500	95%	52%	0%	33°	100%	47%	100%	95%
Tango pink	#E4717A	89%	44%	48%	355°	68%	67%	50%	89%
Tart Orange	#FB4D46	98%	30%	27%	2°	96%	63%	72%	98%
Taupe	#483C32	28%	24%	20%	27°	18%	24%	31%	28%
Taupe gray	#8B8589	55%	52%	54%	320°	3%	53%	4%	55%
Tea green	#D0F0C0	82%	94%	75%	100°	62%	85%	20%	94%
Tea rose	#F4C2C2	96%	76%	76%	0°	69%	86%	20%	96%
Teal	#008080	0%	50%	50%	180°	100%	25%	100%	50%
Teal blue	#367588	21%	46%	53%	194°	43%	37%	60%	53%
Technobotanica	#00FFBF	0%	100%	75%	165°	100%	50%	100%	100%
Telemagenta	#CF3476	81%	20%	46%	334°	62%	51%	75%	81%
Tenné (tawny)	#CD5700	80%	34%	0%	25°	100%	40%	100%	80%
Terra cotta	#E2725B	89%	45%	36%	10°	70%	62%	60%	89%
Thistle	#D8BFD8	85%	75%	85%	300°	24%	80%	12%	85%
Thulian pink	#DE6FA1	87%	44%	63%	333°	63%	65%	50%	87%
Tickle Me Pink	#FC89AC	99%	54%	67%	342°	95%	76%	46%	99%
Tiffany Blue	#0ABAB5	4%	73%	71%	178°	90%	38%	95%	73%
Timberwolf	#DBD7D2	86%	84%	82%	33°	11%	84%	4%	86%
Titanium yellow	#EEE600	93%	90%	0%	58°	100%	47%	100%	93%
Tomato	#FF6347	100%	39%	28%	9°	100%	64%	72%	100%
Tourmaline	#86A1A9	53%	63%	66%	194°	17%	50%	17%	66%
Tropical rainforest	#00755E	0%	46%	37%	168°	100%	23%	100%	46%
True Blue	#2D68C4	0%	45%	81%	207°	100%	41%	100%	81%
Trypan Blue	#1C05B3	11%	2%	70%	248°	95%	36%	95%	70%
Tufts blue	#3E8EDE	24%	56%	87%	210°	71%	56%	70.7%	87.1%
Tumbleweed	#DEAA88	87%	67%	53%	24°	57%	70%	39%	87%
Turquoise	#40E0D0	25%	88%	82%	174°	72%	56%	71%	88%
Turquoise blue	#00FFEF	0%	100%	94%	176°	100%	50%	100%	100%
Turquoise green	#A0D6B4	63%	84%	71%	142°	40%	73%	25%	84%
Turtle green	#8A9A5B	54%	60%	36%	75°	26%	48%	41%	60%
Tuscan	#FAD6A5	98%	84%	65%	35°	90%	81%	34%	98%
Tuscan brown	#6F4E37	44%	31%	22%	25°	34%	33%	50%	44%
Tuscan red	#7C4848	49%	28%	28%	0°	27%	38%	42%	49%
Tuscan tan	#A67B5B	65%	48%	36%	26°	30%	50%	45%	65%
Tuscany	#C09999	75%	60%	60%	0°	24%	68%	20%	75%
Twilight lavender	#8A496B	54%	29%	42%	329°	31%	41%	47%	54%
Tyrian purple	#66023C	40%	1%	24%	325°	96%	20%	98%	40%
UA blue	#0033AA	0%	20%	67%	222°	100%	33%	100%	67%
UA red	#D9004C	85%	0%	30%	339°	100%	43%	100%	85%
Ultramarine	#120A8F	7%	4%	56%	244°	87%	30%	93%	56%
Ultramarine blue	#4166F5	25%	40%	96%	228°	90%	61%	73%	96%
Ultra pink	#FF6FFF	100%	44%	100%	300°	100%	72%	56%	100%
Ultra red	#FC6C85	99%	42%	52%	350°	96%	71%	57%	99%
Umber	#635147	39%	32%	28%	21°	17%	33%	28%	39%
Unbleached silk	#FFDDCA	100%	87%	79%	22°	100%	90%	21%	100%
United Nations blue	#009EDB	0%	62%	86%	197°	100%	43%	100%	86%
University of Pennsylvania red	#A50021	65%	0%	13%	348°	100%	32%	100%	65%
Unmellow yellow	#FFFF66	100%	100%	40%	60°	100%	70%	60%	100%
UP Forest green	#014421	0%	27%	13%	149°	97%	14%	99%	27%
UP maroon	#7B1113	48%	7%	7%	359°	76%	27%	86%	48%
Upsdell red	#AE2029	68%	13%	16%	356°	69%	40%	82%	68%
Uranian blue	#AFDBF5	69%	86%	96%	202°	78%	82%	29%	96%
USAFA blue	#004F98	0%	31%	60%	209°	100%	30%	100%	60%
Van Dyke brown	#664228	40%	26%	16%	25°	44%	28%	60%	0%
Vanilla	#F3E5AB	95%	90%	67%	48°	75%	81%	30%	95%
Vanilla ice	#F38FA9	95%	56%	66%	344°	81%	76%	41%	95%
Vantg blue	#5271FF	32%	44%	100%	229°	100%	66%	68%	100%
Vegas gold	#C5B358	77%	70%	35%	50°	48%	56%	55%	77%
Venetian red	#C80815	78%	3%	8%	356°	92%	41%	96%	78%
Verdigris	#43B3AE	26%	70%	68%	177°	46%	48%	63%	70%
Vermilion	#E34234	89%	26%	20%	5°	76%	55%	77%	89%
Vermilion	#D9381E	85%	22%	12%	8°	76%	48%	86%	85%
Veronica	#A020F0	63%	13%	94%	277°	87%	53%	87%	94%
Violet	#8000FF	50%	0%	100%	270°	100%	50%	100%	100%
Electric Violet (RGB)	#8F00FF	56%	0%	100%	274°	100%	50%	100%	100%
Violet (crayola)	#963D7F	59%	24%	50%	316°	42%	41%	59%	59%
Violet (RYB)	#8601AF	53%	0%	69%	286°	99%	35%	99%	69%
Violet (web)	#EE82EE	93%	51%	93%	300°	76%	72%	45%	93%
Violet-blue	#324AB2	20%	29%	70%	229°	56%	45%	72%	70%
Violet-blue (Crayola)	#766EC8	46%	43%	78%	246°	45%	61%	45%	78%
Violet-red	#F75394	97%	33%	58%	336°	91%	65%	66%	97%
Violet-red(PerBang)	#F0599C	94%	35%	61%	333°	83%	65%	63%	94%
Viridian	#40826D	25%	51%	43%	161°	34%	38%	51%	51%
Viridian green	#009698	0%	59%	60%	181°	100%	30%	100%	60%
Vivid burgundy	#9F1D35	62%	11%	21%	349°	69%	37%	82%	62%
Vivid sky blue	#00CCFF	0%	80%	100%	192°	100%	50%	100%	100%
Vivid tangerine	#FFA089	100%	63%	54%	12°	100%	77%	46%	100%
Vivid violet	#9F00FF	62%	0%	100%	277°	100%	50%	100%	100%
Volt	#CEFF00	80%	100%	0%	72°	100%	50%	100%	100%
Warm black	#004242	0%	26%	26%	180°	100%	13%	100%	25%
Weezy Blue	#189BCC	9%	61%	80%	196°	79%	45%	88%	80%
Wheat	#F5DEB3	96%	87%	70%	39°	77%	83%	27%	96%
White	#FFFFFF	100%	100%	100%	—°	0%	100%	0%	100%
Wild blue yonder	#A2ADD0	64%	68%	82%	226°	33%	73%	22%	82%
Wild orchid	#D470A2	83%	44%	64%	330°	54%	64%	47%	83%
Wild Strawberry	#FF43A4	100%	26%	64%	329°	100%	63%	74%	100%
Wild watermelon	#FC6C85	99%	42%	52%	350°	96%	71%	57%	99%
Willpower orange	#FD5800	99%	35%	0%	21°	100%	50%	100%	99%
Windsor tan	#A75502	65%	33%	1%	30°	98%	33%	99%	65%
Wine	#722F37	45%	18%	22%	353°	42%	32%	59%	45%
Wine Red	#B11226	69%	7%	15%	352°	82%	38%	90%	69%
Wine dregs	#673147	40%	19%	28%	336°	36%	30%	52%	40%
Winter Sky	#FF007C	100%	0%	49%	331°	100%	50%	100%	100%
Wintergreen Dream	#56887D	34%	53%	49%	167°	23%	44%	37%	53%
Wisteria	#C9A0DC	79%	63%	86%	281°	46%	75%	27%	86%
Wood brown	#C19A6B	76%	60%	42%	33°	41%	59%	45%	76%
Xanadu	#738678	45%	53%	47%	136°	8%	49%	14%	53%
Xander	#44500C	27%	31%	5%	71°	74%	18%	85%	31%
Xanthic	#EEED09	93%	93%	4%	60°	93%	48%	97%	93%
Xanthous	#F1B42F	95%	71%	18%	41°	87%	57%	80%	95%
Xbox green	#0E7A0D	5%	48%	5%	119°	81%	27%	89%	48%
Xiaomi orange	#FD4900	99%	29%	0%	17°	100%	50%	100%	99%
Xumo	#413639	25%	21%	22%	344°	9%	23%	17%	25%
Yale Blue	#00356B	0%	21%	42%	210°	100%	21%	100%	42%
Yellow	#FFFF00	100%	100%	0%	60°	100%	50%	100%	100%
Yellow (Crayola)	#FCE883	99%	91%	51%	50°	95%	75%	48%	99%
Yellow (Munsell)	#EFCC00	94%	80%	0%	51°	100%	47%	100%	94%
Yellow (NCS)	#FFD300	100%	83%	0%	50°	100%	50%	100%	100%
Yellow (Pantone)	#FEDF00	100%	87%	0%	53°	100%	50%	100%	100%
Yellow (process)	#FFEF00	100%	94%	0%	56°	100%	50%	100%	100%
Yellow (RYB)	#FEFE33	100%	100%	20%	60°	99%	60%	80%	100%
Yellow-green	#9ACD32	60%	80%	20%	80°	61%	50%	76%	80%
Yellow-green (Crayola)	#C5E384	77%	89%	52%	79°	63%	70%	42%	89%
Yellow-green (Color Wheel)	#30B21A	19%	70%	10%	112°	75%	40%	85%	70%
Yellow Orange	#FFAE42	100%	68%	26%	34°	100%	63%	74%	100%
Yellow Orange (Color Wheel)	#FF9505	100%	58%	2%	36°	100%	51%	98%	100%
Yellow Rose	#FFF000	100%	94%	0%	56°	100%	50%	100%	100%
Yellow Sunshine	#FFF700	100%	97%	0%	58°	100%	50%	100%	100%
YInMn Blue	#2E5090	18%	31%	56%	219°	52%	37%	68%	56%
Zaffer (Zaffre)	#0014A8	0%	8%	66%	233°	100%	33%	100%	66%
Zarqa	#FF4500	100%	27%	0%	16°	100%	50%	100%	100%
Zeal	#91E0B7	57%	88%	72%	149°	56%	72%	35%	88%
Zebra White	#F5F5F5	96%	96%	96%	0°	0%	96%	0%	96%
Zinc gray	#655B55	40%	36%	33%	23°	9%	36%	16%	40%
Zinc white	#FDF8FF	99%	97%	100%	283°	100%	99%	3%	100%
Zinnwaldite brown	#2C1608	17%	9%	3%	23°	69%	10%	82%	17%
Zinzolin	#6C0277	42%	1%	47%	294°	97%	24%	98%	47%
Zircon gray	#807473	50%	45%	45%	5°	5%	48%	10%	50%
Zomp	#39A78E	22%	65%	56%	166°	49%	44%	66%	65%
Zydeco	#20483F	13%	28%	25%	167°	39%	20%	56%	28%

== See also ==
- Basic Color Terms: Their Universality and Evolution (book)
- Color blindness
- Colors of the rainbow
- Eye color
- Index of color-related articles
- List of colors: A–F
- List of colors: G–M
- List of color palettes
- List of colors (compact)
- List of Crayola crayon colors
- Pantone colors
- Pigment
- Primary color
- Secondary color
- Tertiary color
- Tincture (heraldry)
- Valspar
- X11 color names
