= Shades of violet =

Varieties of the color violet

Violet

Spectral coordinates
- Wavelength: 380–450 nm
- Frequency: 800–715 THz

Color coordinates
- Hex triplet: #8000FF
- sRGB^{B} (r, g, b): (128, 0, 255)
- HSV (h, s, v): (270°, 100%, 100%)
- CIELCh_{uv} (L, C, h): (41, 134, 275°)
- Source: W3C
- B: Normalized to [0–255] (byte)

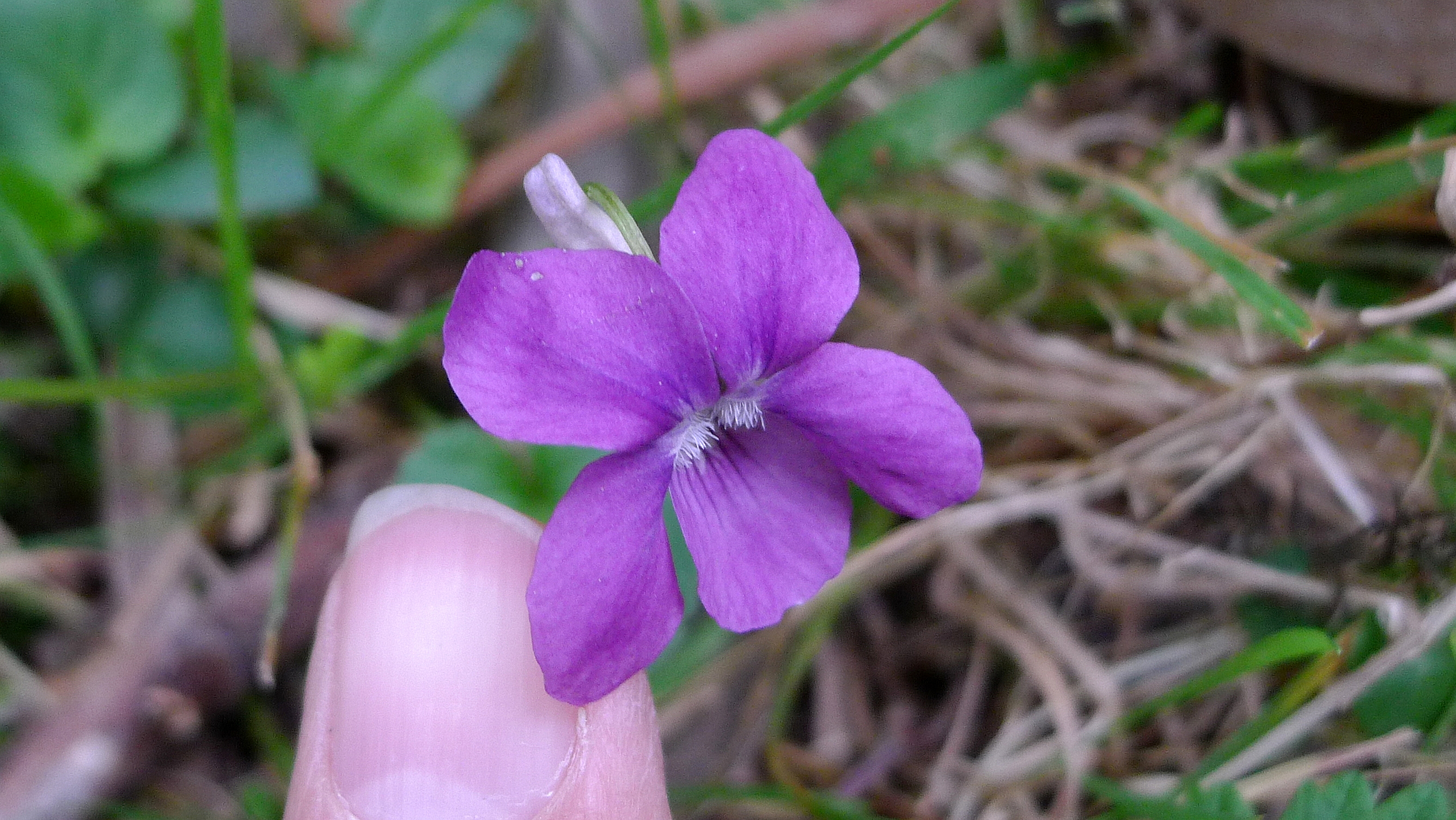
The color violet is named for the violet flower.

Violet is a color term derived from the flower of the same name. There are numerous variations of the color violet, a sampling of which are shown below.

== Definition ==
The term violet has different meanings in different languages, countries and epochs. Even among many modern speakers within the English-speaking world there is confusion about the terms purple and violet. The blue-dominated spectral color beyond blue is referred to as purple by many speakers in the United States, but this color is called violet by many speakers in the United Kingdom. In some British authoritative texts the term purple refers to any mixture of red and blue, suggesting the color term purple covers the full range between red and blue in the United Kingdom. In other texts it is the term violet that covers the same full range of colors. The uncertainty about the range of meanings of the color terms violet and purple is even larger when other languages and historical texts are considered.

== Variations of spectral violet ==
Although pure spectrum violet is outside the color gamut of the RGB color space, the three colors displayed below are rough approximations of the range of colors of actual spectral violet, although the accuracy of the approximation can vary depending on the individual's color vision, and on the color rendition of one's computer monitor.

=== Color wheel violet ===
Violet (color wheel)

Color coordinates
- Hex triplet: #8000FF
- sRGB^{B} (r, g, b): (128, 0, 255)
- HSV (h, s, v): (270°, 100%, 100%)
- CIELCh_{uv} (L, C, h): (41, 134, 275°)
- Source: HTML Color Chart
- ISCC–NBS descriptor: Vivid violet
- B: Normalized to [0–255] (byte)

The tertiary color on the HSV color wheel (also known as the RGB color wheel) precisely halfway between blue and magenta is called color wheel violet. This tone of violet—an approximation of the color violet at about 417 nanometers as plotted on the CIE chromaticity diagram—is shown at right. This tone of violet is actually somewhat toward indigo assuming indigo is accepted as a separate spectrum color, usually quoted as having a range of from about 420 to 450 nanometers. Another name for this color is near violet.

=== Electric violet ===
Electric Violet

Color coordinates
- Hex triplet: #8F00FF
- sRGB^{B} (r, g, b): (143, 0, 255)
- HSV (h, s, v): (274°, 100%, 100%)
- CIELCh_{uv} (L, C, h): (43, 134, 278°)
- Source: HTML Color Chart @274
- ISCC–NBS descriptor: Vivid violet
- B: Normalized to [0–255] (byte)

The color at right, electric violet, is the closest approximation to middle spectrum violet that can be made on a computer screen, given the limitations of the sRGB color gamut. It is an approximation of the color violet at about 400 nanometers as plotted on the CIE chromaticity diagram, in the middle of the violet range of from 380 nanometers to 420 nanometers, assuming indigo as a separate spectrum color from 420 to 450 nanometers. Other names for this color are middle violet or simply violet.

==== Vivid violet ====
Vivid Violet

Color coordinates
- Hex triplet: #9F00FF
- sRGB^{B} (r, g, b): (159, 0, 255)
- HSV (h, s, v): (277°, 100%, 100%)
- CIELCh_{uv} (L, C, h): (45, 134, 281°)
- Source: HTML Color Chart @277
- ISCC–NBS descriptor: Vivid violet
- B: Normalized to [0–255] (byte)

Displayed at right is the color vivid violet, a color approximately equivalent to the violet seen at the extreme edge of human visual perception. When plotted on the CIE chromaticity diagram, it can be seen that this is a hue corresponding to that of a visual stimulus of approximately 380 nm on the spectrum. Thus another name for this color is extreme violet.

== Web colors ==
=== Web color "violet" ===
Violet (web color)

Color coordinates
- Hex triplet: #EE82EE
- sRGB^{B} (r, g, b): (238, 130, 238)
- HSV (h, s, v): (300°, 45%, 93%)
- CIELCh_{uv} (L, C, h): (70, 85, 308°)
- Source: X11; X11 color names
- ISCC–NBS descriptor: Vivid purple
- B: Normalized to [0–255] (byte)

The so-called web color "violet" is in actuality not really a tint of violet, a spectral color, but is a non-spectral color. The web color violet is actually a rather pale tint of magenta because it has equal amounts of red and blue (the definition of magenta for computer display), and some of the green primary mixed in, unlike most other variants of violet that are closer to blue. This same color appears as "violet" in the X11 color names.

=== Pigment violet (web color dark violet) ===
Dark Violet

Color coordinates
- Hex triplet: #9400D3
- sRGB^{B} (r, g, b): (148, 0, 211)
- HSV (h, s, v): (282°, 100%, 83%)
- CIELCh_{uv} (L, C, h): (40, 110, 285°)
- Source: X11
- ISCC–NBS descriptor: Vivid violet
- B: Normalized to [0–255] (byte)

The color box at right displays the web color dark violet which is equivalent to pigment violet, i.e., the color violet as it would typically be reproduced by artist's paints, colored pencils, or crayons as opposed to the brighter "electric" violet above that it is possible to reproduce on a computer screen.

Compare the subtractive colors to the additive colors in the two primary color charts in the article on primary colors to see the distinction between electric colors as reproducible from light on a computer screen (additive colors) and the pigment colors reproducible with pigments (subtractive colors); the additive colors are a lot brighter because they are produced from light instead of pigment.

Pigment violet (web color dark violet) represents the way the color violet was always reproduced in pigments, paints, or colored pencils in the 1950s. By the 1970s, because of the advent of psychedelic art, artists became used to brighter pigments, and pigments called "Violet" that are the pigment equivalent of the electric violet reproduced in the section above became available in artists pigments and colored pencils. (When approximating electric violet in artists pigments, a bit of white pigment is added to pigment violet.)

== Other variations of the color violet ==
=== African violet ===
African Violet
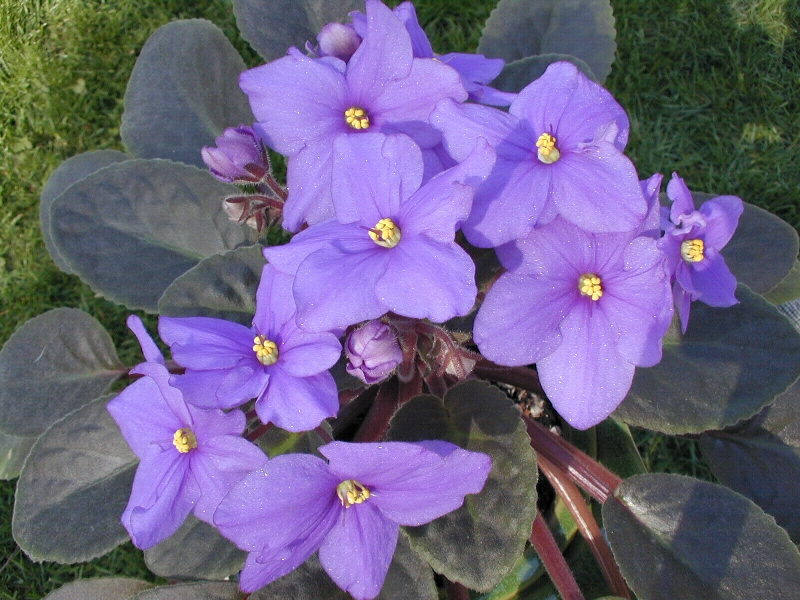
- African violets

Color coordinates
- Hex triplet: #B284BE
- sRGB^{B} (r, g, b): (178, 132, 190)
- HSV (h, s, v): (288°, 31%, 75%)
- CIELCh_{uv} (L, C, h): (61, 45, 298°)
- Source: Pantone TPX
- ISCC–NBS descriptor: Light purple
- B: Normalized to [0–255] (byte)

The color African violet is displayed at right.

The source of this color is the "Pantone Textile Paper eXtended (TPX)" color list, color #16-3250 TPX—African Violet.

=== Chinese violet ===
Chinese Violet

Color coordinates
- Hex triplet: #856088
- sRGB^{B} (r, g, b): (133, 96, 136)
- HSV (h, s, v): (296°, 29%, 53%)
- CIELCh_{uv} (L, C, h): (46, 32, 304°)
- Source: Pantone TPX
- ISCC–NBS descriptor: Moderate purple
- B: Normalized to [0–255] (byte)

The color Chinese violet is displayed at right.

The first recorded use of Chinese violet as a color name in English was in 1912.

The source of this color is the "Pantone Textile Paper eXtended (TPX)" color list, color #18-3418 TPX—Chinese Violet.

=== English violet ===
English Violet

Color coordinates
- Hex triplet: #563C5C
- sRGB^{B} (r, g, b): (86, 60, 92)
- HSV (h, s, v): (289°, 35%, 36%)
- CIELCh_{uv} (L, C, h): (29, 23, 299°)
- Source: ISCC-NBS
- ISCC–NBS descriptor: Dark purple
- B: Normalized to [0–255] (byte)

The color English violet is displayed at right.

The first recorded use of English violet as a color name in English was in 1928.

=== French violet ===
French Violet

Color coordinates
- Hex triplet: #8806CE
- sRGB^{B} (r, g, b): (136, 6, 206)
- HSV (h, s, v): (279°, 97%, 81%)
- CIELCh_{uv} (L, C, h): (38, 107, 283°)
- Source: Pourpre.com
- ISCC–NBS descriptor: Vivid violet
- B: Normalized to [0–255] (byte)

At right is displayed the color French violet, which is the tone of violet that is called violet in the Pourpre.com color list, a color list widely popular in France.

=== Grape ===
Grape
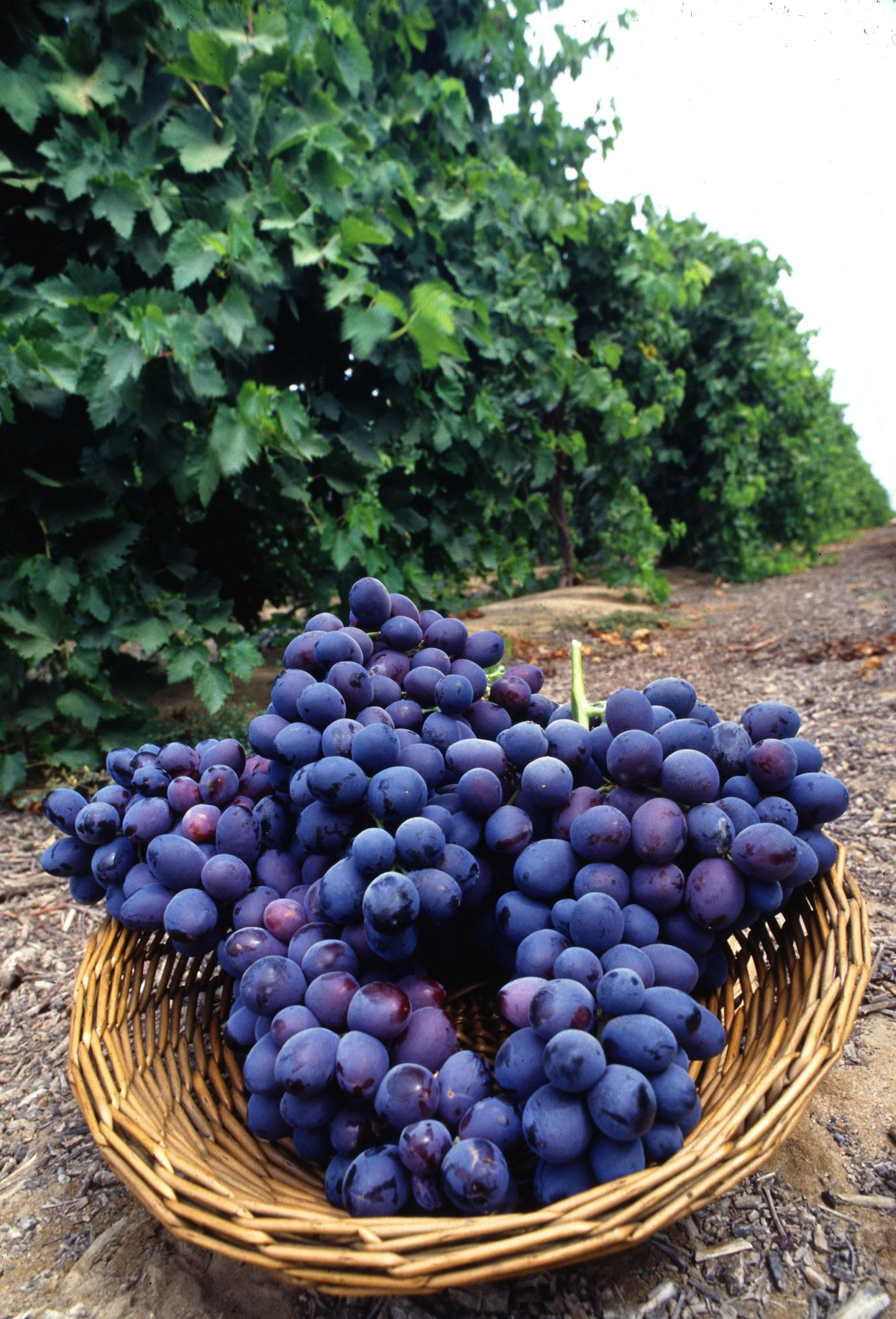
- Fresh purple grapes

Color coordinates
- Hex triplet: #6F2DA8
- sRGB^{B} (r, g, b): (111, 45, 168)
- HSV (h, s, v): (272°, 73%, 66%)
- CIELCh_{uv} (L, C, h): (34, 80, 281°)
- Source: Crayola
- ISCC–NBS descriptor: Vivid violet
- B: Normalized to [0–255] (byte)

Grape is a color that is a representation of the color of grapes.

It is currently unknown when grape was first used as a color name in English, but in 1994, "grape" was made into one of the Crayola Magic Scent crayon colors.

=== Japanese violet ===
Violet (JTC)

Color coordinates
- Hex triplet: #5B3256
- sRGB^{B} (r, g, b): (91, 50, 86)
- HSV (h, s, v): (307°, 45%, 36%)
- CIELCh_{uv} (L, C, h): (27, 28, 314°)
- Source: JTC
- ISCC–NBS descriptor: Dark reddish purple
- B: Normalized to [0–255] (byte)

The color Japanese violet or Sumire is shown at right.

This is the color called "violet" in the traditional Japanese colors group, a group of colors in use since beginning in 660 CE in the form of various dyes that are used in designing kimono.

The name of this color in Japanese is sumire-iro, meaning "violet color".

=== Lavender ===
Lavender
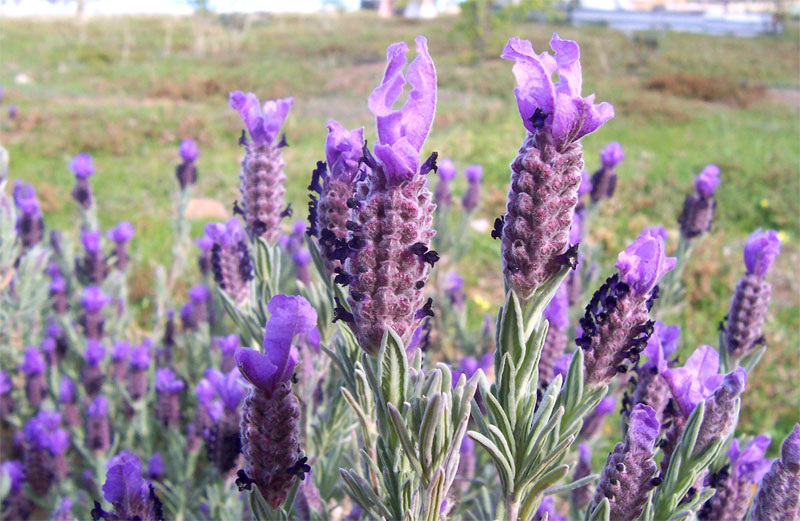
- Lavender flowers

Color coordinates
- Hex triplet: #B57EDC
- sRGB^{B} (r, g, b): (181, 126, 220)
- HSV (h, s, v): (275°, 43%, 86%)
- CIELCh_{uv} (L, C, h): (62, 71, 287°)
- Source: Maerz and Paul
- ISCC–NBS descriptor: Strong purple
- B: Normalized to [0–255] (byte)

At right is displayed the color lavender. This color may also be called lavender (floral) or floral lavender to distinguish it from the web color lavender. It is the color of the central part of the lavender flower.

The first recorded use of the word lavender as a color term in English was in 1705.

Since the color lavender has a hue code of 275, it may be regarded as a light tone of violet.

=== Mauve ===
Mauve (Mallow)
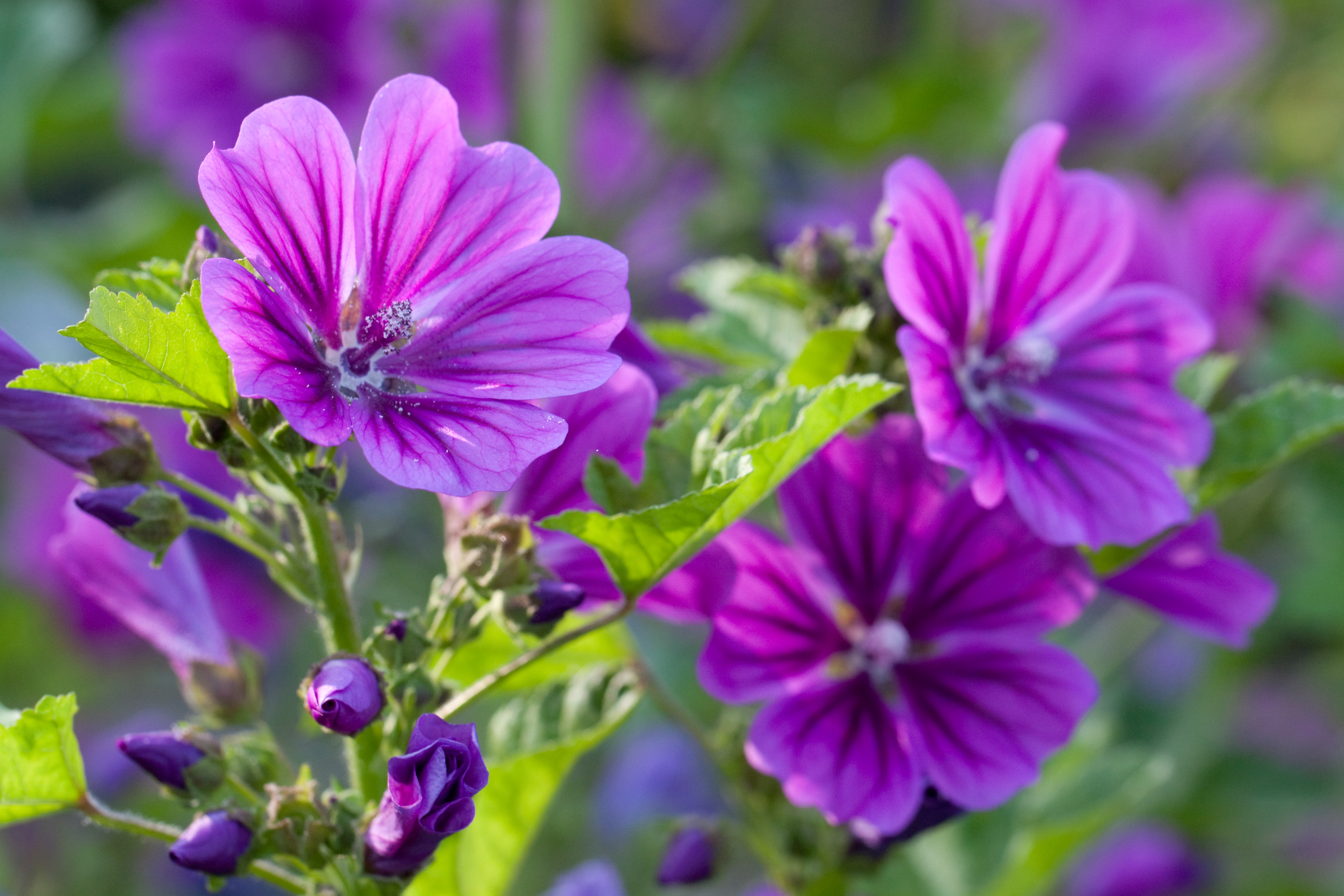
- Mallow (mauve) flowers

Color coordinates
- Hex triplet: #E0B0FF
- sRGB^{B} (r, g, b): (224, 176, 255)
- HSV (h, s, v): (276°, 31%, 100%)
- CIELCh_{uv} (L, C, h): (79, 61, 290°)
- Source: Maerz and Paul
- ISCC–NBS descriptor: Brilliant purple
- B: Normalized to [0–255] (byte)

Mauve (from the French form of Malva "mallow") is a color that is named after the mallow flower. Another name for the color is mallow with the first recorded use of mallow as a color name in English in 1611.

Since the color mauve has a hue code of 276, it may be regarded as a pale tone of violet.

=== Petunia ===
Petunia
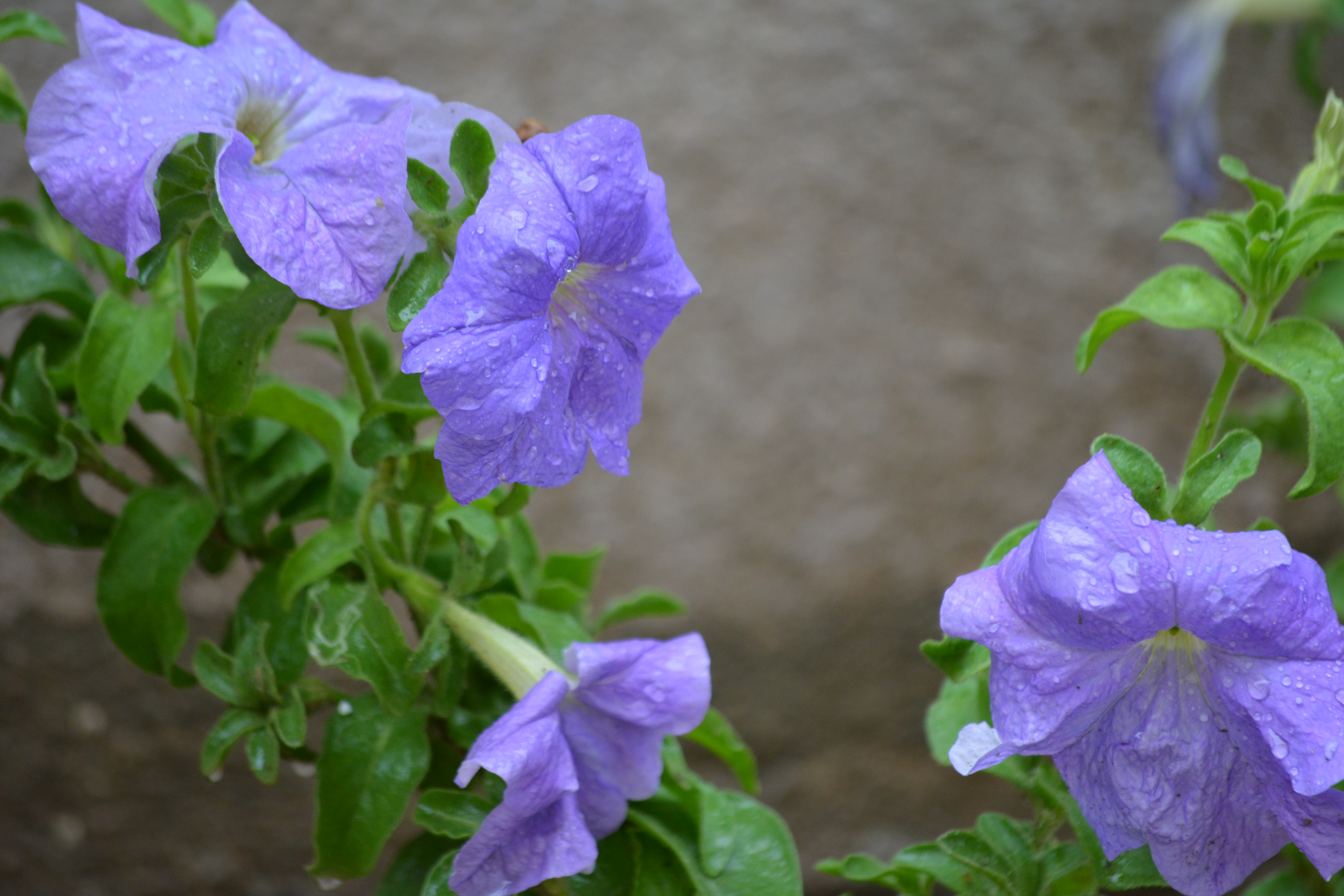
- Petunia integrifolia

Color coordinates
- Hex triplet: #470659
- sRGB^{B} (r, g, b): (71, 6, 89)
- HSV (h, s, v): (287°, 93%, 35%)
- CIELCh_{uv} (L, C, h): (16, 40, 293°)
- Source: Supertunia Vista Snowdrift
- ISCC–NBS descriptor: Very dark violet
- B: Normalized to [0–255] (byte)

Displayed at right is the color petunia.

It represents the color of petunia blooms.

=== Russian violet ===
Russian Violet

Color coordinates
- Hex triplet: #32174D
- sRGB^{B} (r, g, b): (50, 23, 77)
- HSV (h, s, v): (270°, 70%, 30%)
- CIELCh_{uv} (L, C, h): (15, 29, 281°)
- Source: ISCC-NBS
- ISCC–NBS descriptor: Deep violet
- B: Normalized to [0–255] (byte)

The color Russian violet is displayed at right.

The first recorded use of Russian violet as a color name in English was in 1926.

=== Spanish violet ===
Violet (G&S)

Color coordinates
- Hex triplet: #4C2882
- sRGB^{B} (r, g, b): (76, 40, 130)
- HSV (h, s, v): (264°, 69%, 51%)
- CIELCh_{uv} (L, C, h): (26, 59, 277°)
- Source: Gallego and Sanz
- ISCC–NBS descriptor: Deep violet
- B: Normalized to [0–255] (byte)

Spanish violet is the color that is called Violeta (the Spanish word for "violet") in the Guía de coloraciones (Guide to colorations) by Rosa Gallego and Juan Carlos Sanz, a color dictionary published in 2005 that is widely popular in the Hispanophone realm.

=== Ultra Violet (Pantone) ===
Ultra Violet

Color coordinates
- Hex triplet: #645394
- sRGB^{B} (r, g, b): (100, 83, 148)
- HSV (h, s, v): (256°, 44%, 58%)
- CIELCh_{uv} (L, C, h): (40, 50, 274°)
- Source: Pantone TPX
- ISCC–NBS descriptor: Moderate violet
- B: Normalized to [0–255] (byte)

The color Ultra Violet is displayed at right.

The source of this color is the "Pantone Textile Paper eXtended (TPX)" color list, color #18-3838 TPX—Ultra Violet.

Ultra Violet was named as Pantone's Color of the Year for 2018.

It should not be confused with ultraviolet.

=== Wisteria ===
Wisteria
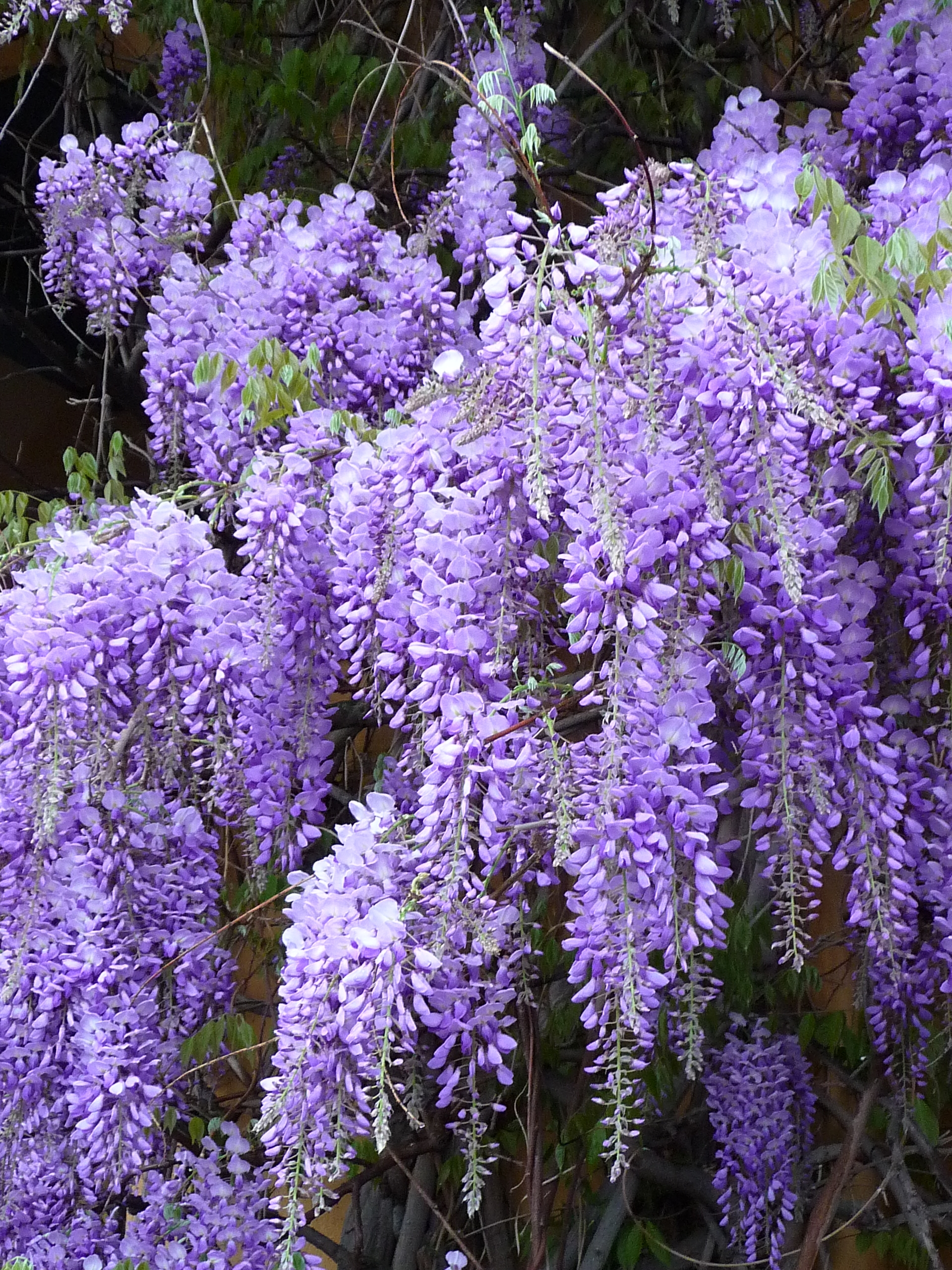
- Wisteria sinensis

Color coordinates
- Hex triplet: #C9A0DC
- sRGB^{B} (r, g, b): (201, 160, 220)
- HSV (h, s, v): (281°, 27%, 86%)
- CIELCh_{uv} (L, C, h): (71, 47, 293°)
- Source: Crayola
- ISCC–NBS descriptor: Light purple
- B: Normalized to [0–255] (byte)

Displayed at right is the color wisteria.

It represents the color of wisteria blooms. A crayon of this color and name was formulated by Crayola in 1993.

== See also ==
- Carmine (color)
- Cerise (color)
- Crimson
- Indigo
- Lavender (color)
- Lilac (color)
- Lists of colors
- Magenta
- Mauve
- Periwinkle (color)
- Purple
- Raspberry (color)
- Red-violet
- Rose (color)
- Ruby (color)
- Shades of purple
- Ultramarine
- Shades of magenta
