= Shades of magenta =

Varieties of the color magenta

Magenta

Color coordinates
- Hex triplet: #FF00FF
- sRGB^{B} (r, g, b): (255, 0, 255)
- HSV (h, s, v): (300°, 100%, 100%)
- CIELCh_{uv} (L, C, h): (60, 137, 308°)
- Source: X11
- B: Normalized to [0–255] (byte)

The color magenta has notable tints and shades. These various colors are shown below.

== Definition of magenta ==
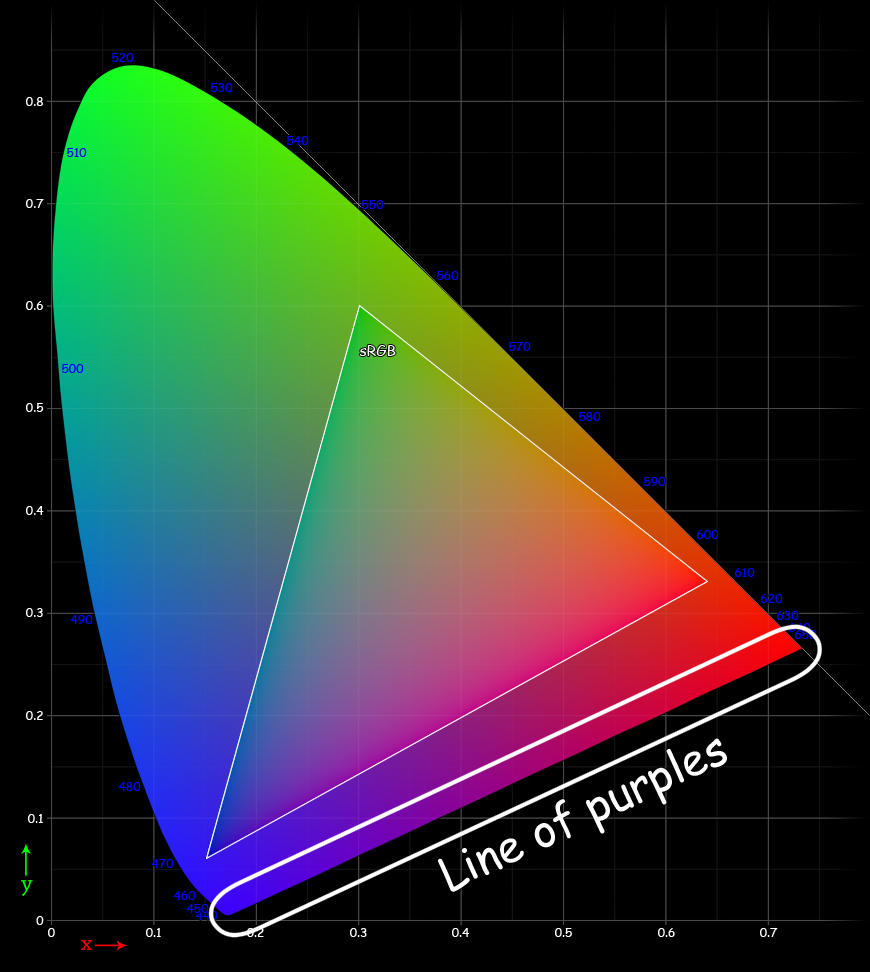
The most saturated magentas that humans are able to perceive lie on the line of purples, which connects violet and red in the chromaticity diagram

Magenta is perceived when short and long wavelengths of visible light reach the eye, and little to no medium-wavelength light does.

Magenta is not a spectral but an extraspectral color: it cannot be generated by light of a single wavelength. Humans, being trichromats, can only see as far as 380 nanometers into the spectrum, i.e., as far as violet.

The hue magenta is the complement of green: magenta pigments absorb green light, thus magenta and green are opposite colors.

== Three major historical variations of magenta ==
=== Magenta dye (original variation) (1860) ===
Magenta dye

Color coordinates
- Hex triplet: #CA1F7B
- sRGB^{B} (r, g, b): (202, 31, 123)
- HSV (h, s, v): (328°, 85%, 79%)
- CIELCh_{uv} (L, C, h): (46, 100, 347°)
- Source: Handprint.com
- ISCC–NBS descriptor: Vivid purplish red
- B: Normalized to [0–255] (byte)

Before printer's magenta was invented in the 1890s for CMYK printing, and electric magenta was invented in the 1980s for computer displays, these two artificially engineered colors were preceded by the color displayed at right, which is the color originally called magenta made from coal tar dyes in the year 1859. Besides being called original magenta, magenta dye color is also called rich magenta to distinguish it from the colors printer's magenta and electric magenta, shown below.

Magenta was one of the first aniline dyes, discovered shortly after the Battle of Magenta (1859), which occurred near the town of Magenta in northern Italy. The color was originally called fuchsine or roseine, but for marketing purposes in 1860 the color name was changed to magenta after the battle. Hence, the color is named indirectly after the town.

=== Process magenta (pigment magenta) (printer's magenta) (1890s) ===
Magenta (subtractive primary)

Color coordinates
- Hex triplet: #FF0090
- sRGB^{B} (r, g, b): (255, 0, 144)
- HSV (h, s, v): (326°, 100%, 100%)
- CIELCh_{uv} (L, C, h): (55, 137, 350°)
- Source: tintbook.com CMYK
- ISCC–NBS descriptor: Vivid purplish red
- B: Normalized to [0–255] (byte)

Cyan, magenta and black and yellow are the three subtractive primary colors used in printing.

In color printing, the color called process magenta or pigment magenta is one of the three primary pigment colors which, along with yellow and cyan, constitute the three subtractive primary colors of pigment. (The secondary colors of pigment are blue, green, and red.) The CMYK printing process was invented in the 1890s, when newspapers began to publish color comic strips.

Process magenta is not an RGB color, and there is no fixed conversion from CMYK primaries to RGB. Different formulations are used for printer's ink, so there can be variations in the printed color that is pure magenta ink. A typical formulation of process magenta is shown in the color box at right. The source of the color shown at right is the color magenta that is shown in the diagram located at the bottom of the following website offering tintbooks for CMYK printing: Tintbooks - Get Accurate CMYK Color Results For Your Printing Projects.

=== Web colors magenta and fuchsia (1990s) ===
Magenta (additive secondary)

Color coordinates
- Hex triplet: #FF00FF
- sRGB^{B} (r, g, b): (255, 0, 255)
- HSV (h, s, v): (300°, 100%, 100%)
- CIELCh_{uv} (L, C, h): (60, 137, 308°)
- Source: X11
- ISCC–NBS descriptor: Vivid purple
- B: Normalized to [0–255] (byte)

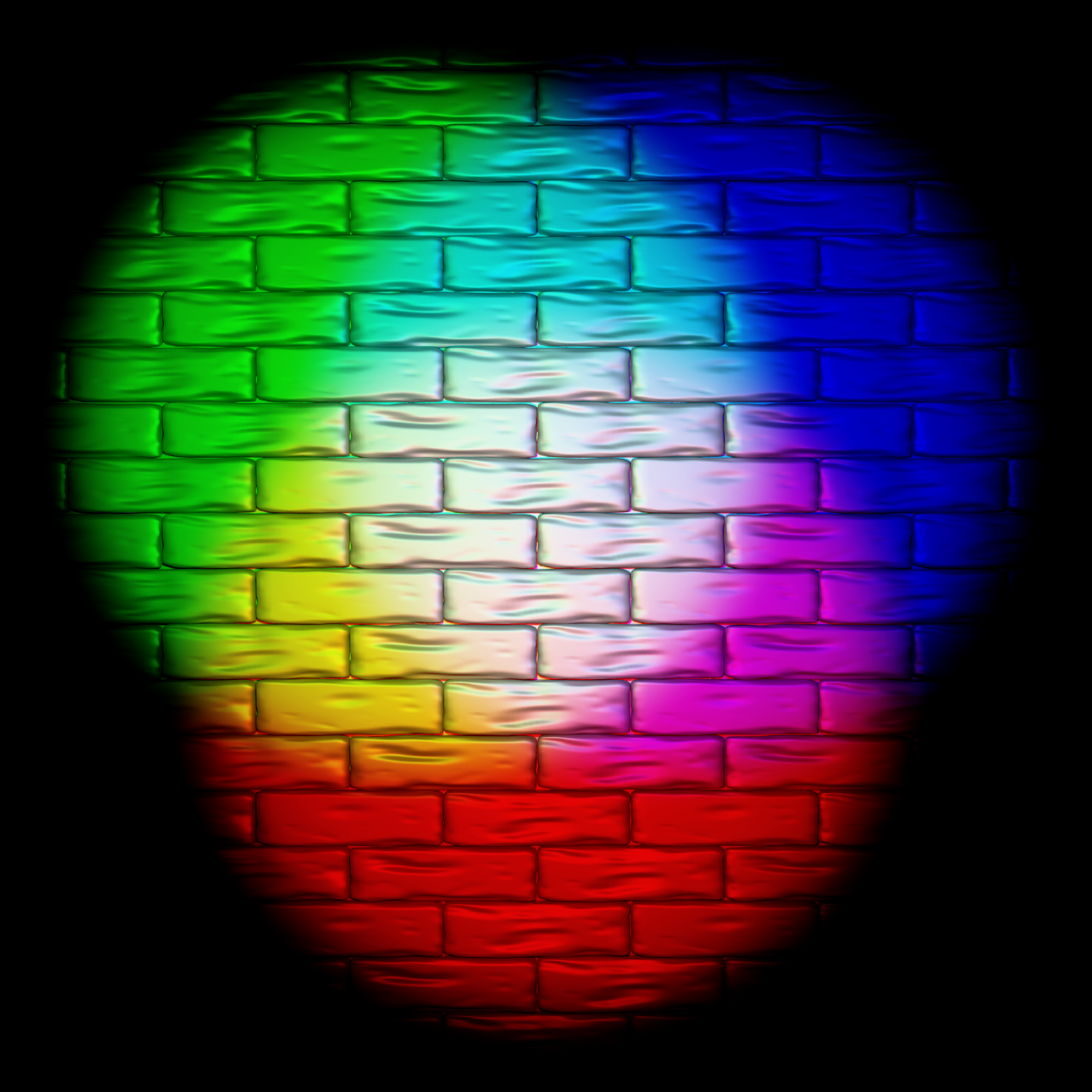
Red, green and blue lights, representing the three basic additive primary colors of the RGB color system, red, green, and blue. Magenta light is composed of equal amounts of red and blue light.

Magenta, shown at the right, is one of the three secondary colors in the RGB color model. It is made by a mixture of red and blue light at equal intensity. It is called magenta on X11 list of color names, and fuchsia on the HTML color list. The web colors magenta and fuchsia are exactly the same color. Sometimes the web color magenta is called electric magenta or electronic magenta.

== Additional variations of magenta ==
=== African violet ===
African Violet
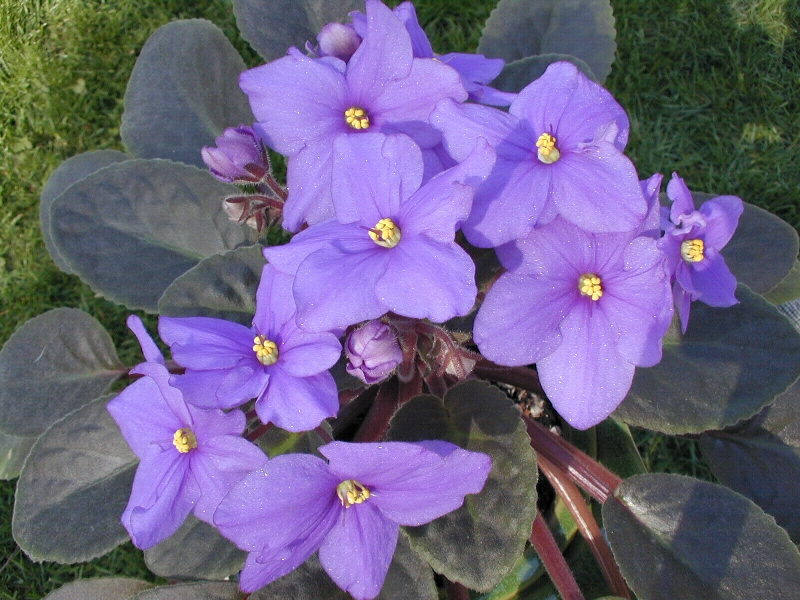
- African violets

Color coordinates
- Hex triplet: #B284BE
- sRGB^{B} (r, g, b): (178, 132, 190)
- HSV (h, s, v): (288°, 31%, 75%)
- CIELCh_{uv} (L, C, h): (61, 45, 298°)
- Source: Pantone TPX
- ISCC–NBS descriptor: Light purple
- B: Normalized to [0–255] (byte)

The color African violet is displayed at right.

The source of this color is the "Pantone Textile Paper eXtended (TPX)" color list, color #16-3250 TPX—African Violet.

=== Amaranth ===
Amaranth purple
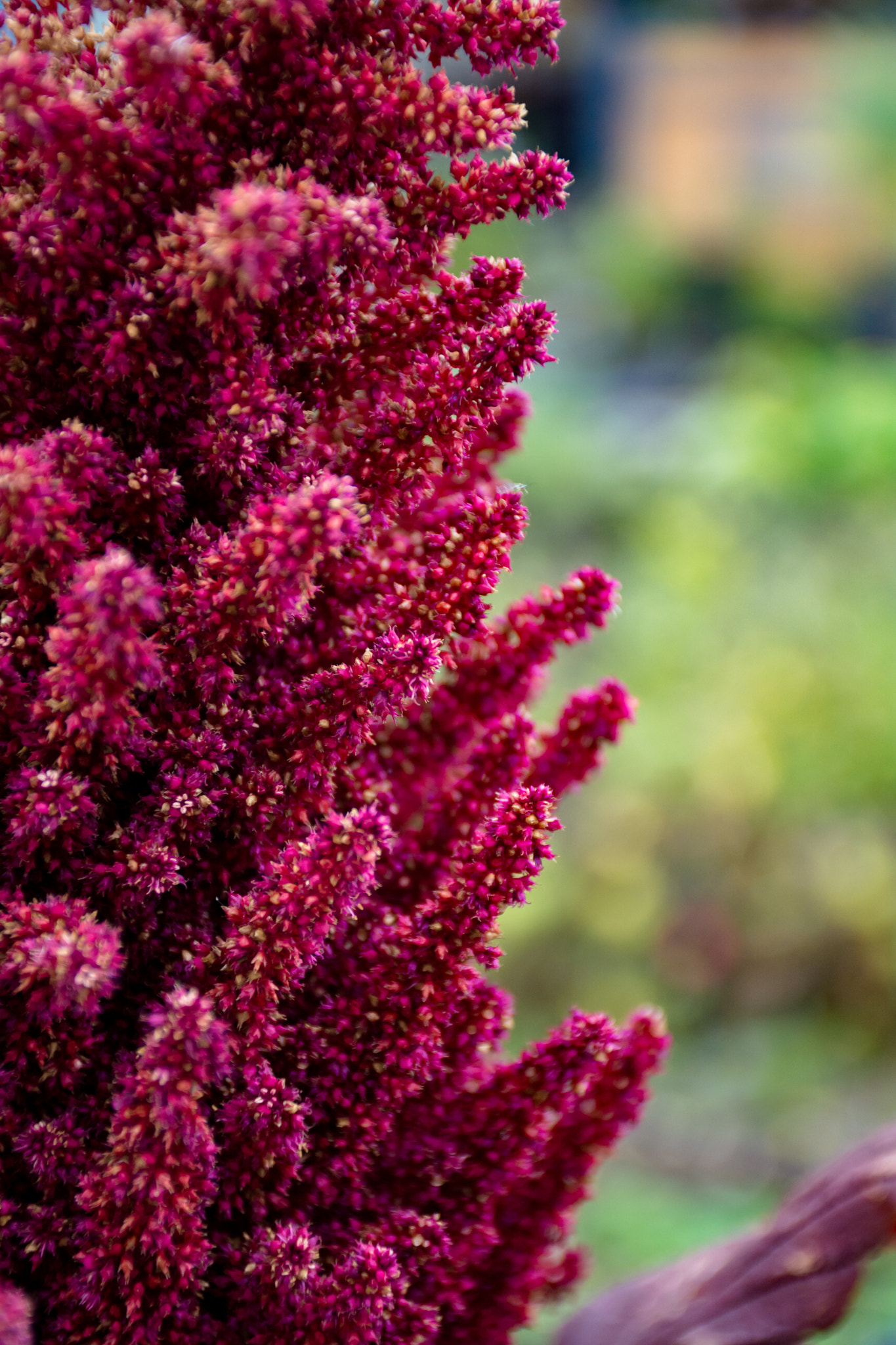
- Amaranth

Color coordinates
- Hex triplet: #AB274F
- sRGB^{B} (r, g, b): (171, 39, 79)
- HSV (h, s, v): (342°, 77%, 67%)
- CIELCh_{uv} (L, C, h): (39, 88, 1°)
- Source: Maerz and Paul
- ISCC–NBS descriptor: Vivid red
- B: Normalized to [0–255] (byte)

Amaranth (color) is a reddish-rose color that is a representation of the color of the flower of the amaranth plant. The color amaranth purple is displayed at right.

=== Chinese violet ===
Chinese Violet

Color coordinates
- Hex triplet: #856088
- sRGB^{B} (r, g, b): (133, 96, 136)
- HSV (h, s, v): (296°, 29%, 53%)
- CIELCh_{uv} (L, C, h): (46, 32, 304°)
- Source: Pantone TPX
- ISCC–NBS descriptor: Moderate purple
- B: Normalized to [0–255] (byte)

The color Chinese violet is displayed at right.

The first recorded use of Chinese violet as a color name in English was in 1912.

The source of this color is the "Pantone Textile Paper eXtended (TPX)" color list, color #18-3418 TPX—Chinese Violet.

=== Dark magenta ===
Dark Magenta

Color coordinates
- Hex triplet: #8B008B
- sRGB^{B} (r, g, b): (139, 0, 139)
- HSV (h, s, v): (300°, 100%, 55%)
- CIELCh_{uv} (L, C, h): (33, 74, 308°)
- Source: X11
- ISCC–NBS descriptor: Vivid purple
- B: Normalized to [0–255] (byte)

Displayed at right is the web color dark magenta.

=== English violet ===
English Violet

Color coordinates
- Hex triplet: #563C5C
- sRGB^{B} (r, g, b): (86, 60, 92)
- HSV (h, s, v): (289°, 35%, 36%)
- CIELCh_{uv} (L, C, h): (29, 23, 299°)
- Source: ISCC-NBS
- ISCC–NBS descriptor: Dark purple
- B: Normalized to [0–255] (byte)

The color English violet is displayed at right.

The first recorded use of English violet as a color name in English was in 1928.

=== Finn ===
Finn

Color coordinates
- Hex triplet: #683068
- sRGB^{B} (r, g, b): (104, 48, 104)
- HSV (h, s, v): (300°, 54%, 41%)
- CIELCh_{uv} (L, C, h): (30, 40, 308°)
- Source: hexcolor.co
- ISCC–NBS descriptor: Dark magenta
- B: Normalized to [0–255] (byte)

The color Finn is displayed at right.

Finn is a dark magenta color.

=== Halayà úbe ===
Halayà úbe
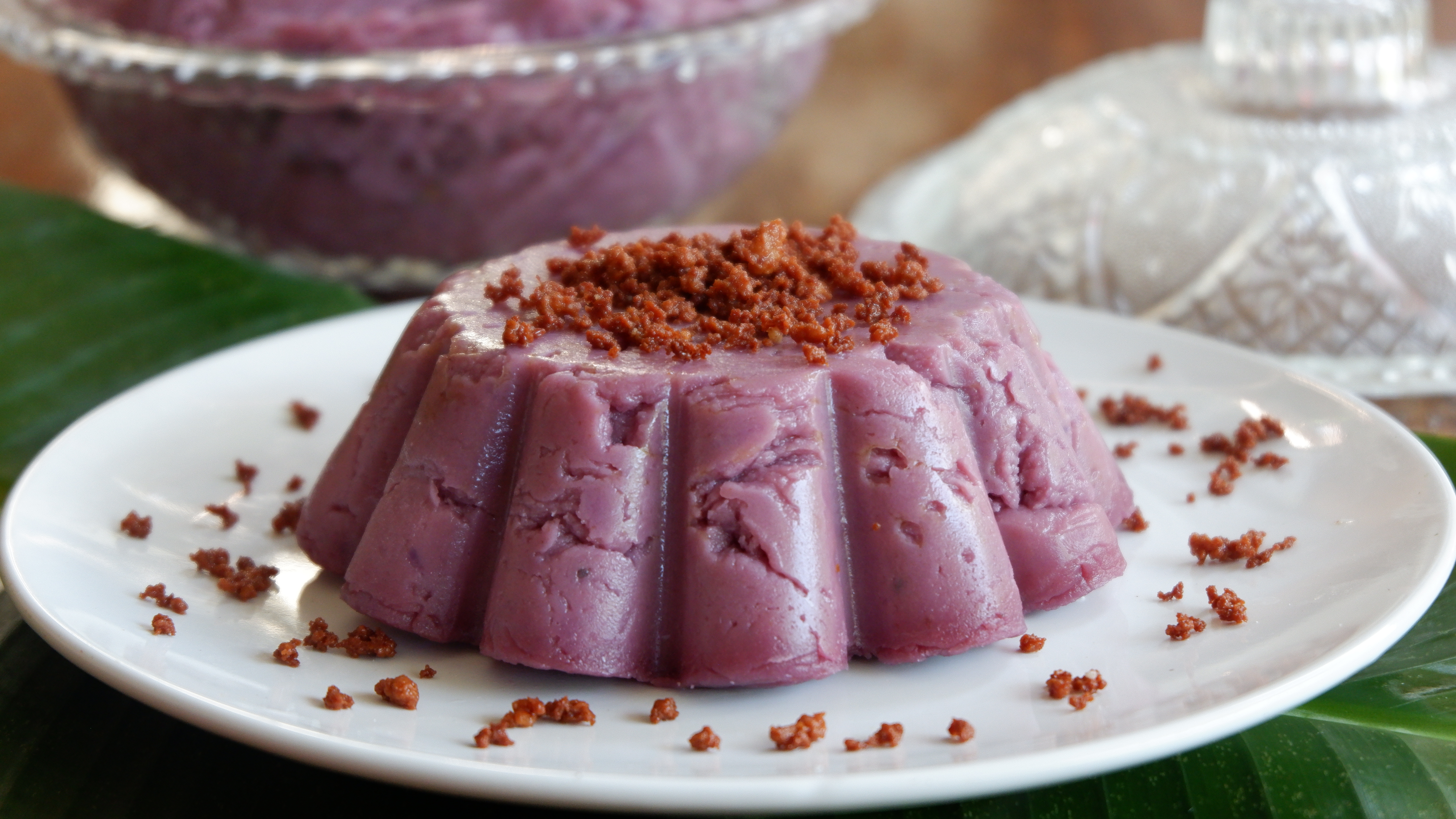
- Halayà úbe, Filipino dessert

Color coordinates
- Hex triplet: #663854
- sRGB^{B} (r, g, b): (102, 56, 84)
- HSV (h, s, v): (323°, 45%, 40%)
- CIELCh_{uv} (L, C, h): (30, 28, 332°)
- Source: ColorHexa
- ISCC–NBS descriptor: Dark reddish purple
- B: Normalized to [0–255] (byte)

The color Halayà úbe is shown at right.

The color halayà úbe is a medium dark shade of magenta-pink. Ube halaya is the main base in ube/purple yam flavored-pastries and ube ice cream.

=== Hot magenta ===
Hot magenta

Color coordinates
- Hex triplet: #FF1DCE
- sRGB^{B} (r, g, b): (255, 29, 206)
- HSV (h, s, v): (313°, 89%, 100%)
- CIELCh_{uv} (L, C, h): (59, 124, 326°)
- Source: Crayola
- ISCC–NBS descriptor: Vivid reddish purple
- B: Normalized to [0–255] (byte)

Displayed at right is the color hot magenta.

This color was formulated by Crayola in 1990, recycling the name from the color now known as "razzle dazzle rose".

=== Japanese violet ===
Violet (JTC)

Color coordinates
- Hex triplet: #5B3256
- sRGB^{B} (r, g, b): (91, 50, 86)
- HSV (h, s, v): (307°, 45%, 36%)
- CIELCh_{uv} (L, C, h): (27, 28, 314°)
- Source: JTC
- ISCC–NBS descriptor: Dark reddish purple
- B: Normalized to [0–255] (byte)

The color Japanese violet is shown at right.

This is the color called "violet" in the traditional Japanese colors group, a group of colors in use since beginning in 660 CE in the form of various dyes that are used in designing kimono.

The name of this color in Japanese is sumire-iro, meaning "violet color".

=== Magenta (Crayola) ===
Magenta (Crayola)

Color coordinates
- Hex triplet: #F653A6
- sRGB^{B} (r, g, b): (246, 83, 166)
- HSV (h, s, v): (329°, 66%, 96%)
- CIELCh_{uv} (L, C, h): (60, 102, 344°)
- Source: Crayola
- ISCC–NBS descriptor: Vivid purplish red
- B: Normalized to [0–255] (byte)

At right is displayed a Crayola color formulated in 1949; it was originally called brilliant rose but the name was changed in 1958 to magenta.

This color has a hue angle of 329, which is close to the hue angle of the color rose, which is 330.

=== Magenta haze ===
Magenta Haze

Color coordinates
- Hex triplet: #9F4576
- sRGB^{B} (r, g, b): (159, 69, 118)
- HSV (h, s, v): (327°, 57%, 62%)
- CIELCh_{uv} (L, C, h): (43, 56, 339°)
- Source: Pantone TPX
- ISCC–NBS descriptor: Moderate purplish red
- B: Normalized to [0–255] (byte)

Displayed at right is the color magenta haze.

The source of this color is the "Pantone Textile Paper eXtended (TPX)" color list, color #18-2525 TPX—Magenta Haze.

=== Magenta (Pantone) ===
Magenta (Pantone)

Color coordinates
- Hex triplet: #D0417E
- sRGB^{B} (r, g, b): (208, 65, 126)
- HSV (h, s, v): (334°, 69%, 82%)
- CIELCh_{uv} (L, C, h): (50, 91, 351°)
- Source: Pantone TPX
- ISCC–NBS descriptor: Vivid purplish red
- B: Normalized to [0–255] (byte)

Displayed at right is the color magenta (Pantone), i.e., the color that is called magenta in the Pantone color system.

The source of this color is the "Pantone Textile Paper eXtended (TPX)" color list, color #17-2036 TPX—Magenta.

=== Magnetic magenta ===
Magnetic magenta

Color coordinates
- Hex triplet: #BF3981
- sRGB^{B} (r, g, b): (191, 57, 129)
- HSV (h, s, v): (328°, 70%, 75%)
- CIELCh_{uv} (L, C, h): (46, 82, 343°)
- Source: Crayola
- B: Normalized to [0–255] (byte)

Displayed at right is the color magnetic magenta.

This color was formulated by Crayola in 2019 as a Metallic FX color.

This is supposed to be a metallic color; however, there is no mechanism for displaying metallic colors on a flat computer screen.

=== Orchid ===
Orchid
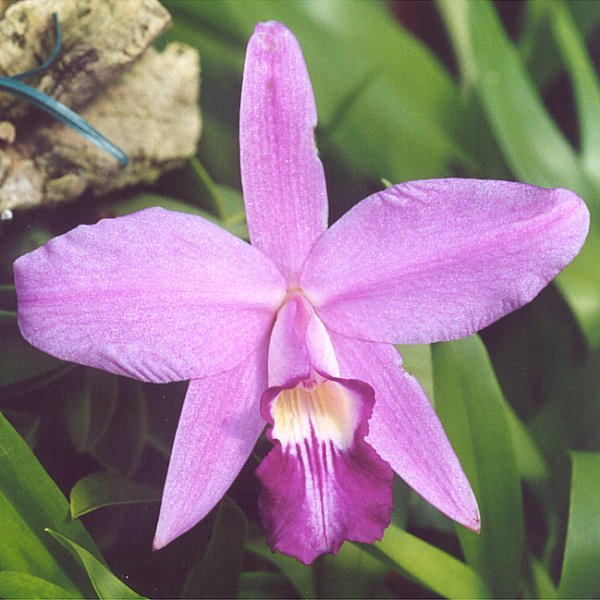
- Pink orchid

Color coordinates
- Hex triplet: #DA70D6
- sRGB^{B} (r, g, b): (218, 112, 214)
- HSV (h, s, v): (302°, 49%, 85%)
- CIELCh_{uv} (L, C, h): (63, 80, 310°)
- Source: X11
- ISCC–NBS descriptor: Vivid purple
- B: Normalized to [0–255] (byte)

The color orchid, since it has a hue code of 302, may be classified as a rich tone of magenta. Orchid is a representation of the color of the orchid flower.

The first recorded use of orchid as a color name in English was in 1915.

In 1987, orchid was included as one of the X11 colors. After the invention of the World Wide Web in 1991, these became known as the X11 web colors.

=== Pale purple ===
Pale Purple

Color coordinates
- Hex triplet: #FAE6FA
- sRGB^{B} (r, g, b): (250, 230, 250)
- HSV (h, s, v): (300°, 8%, 98%)
- CIELCh_{uv} (L, C, h): (93, 17, 308°)
- Source: Pantone TPX
- ISCC–NBS descriptor: Pale purplish pink
- B: Normalized to [0–255] (byte)

Pale purple is a pale tint of magenta despite it being called a purple.

=== Plum ===
Plum (Crayola)
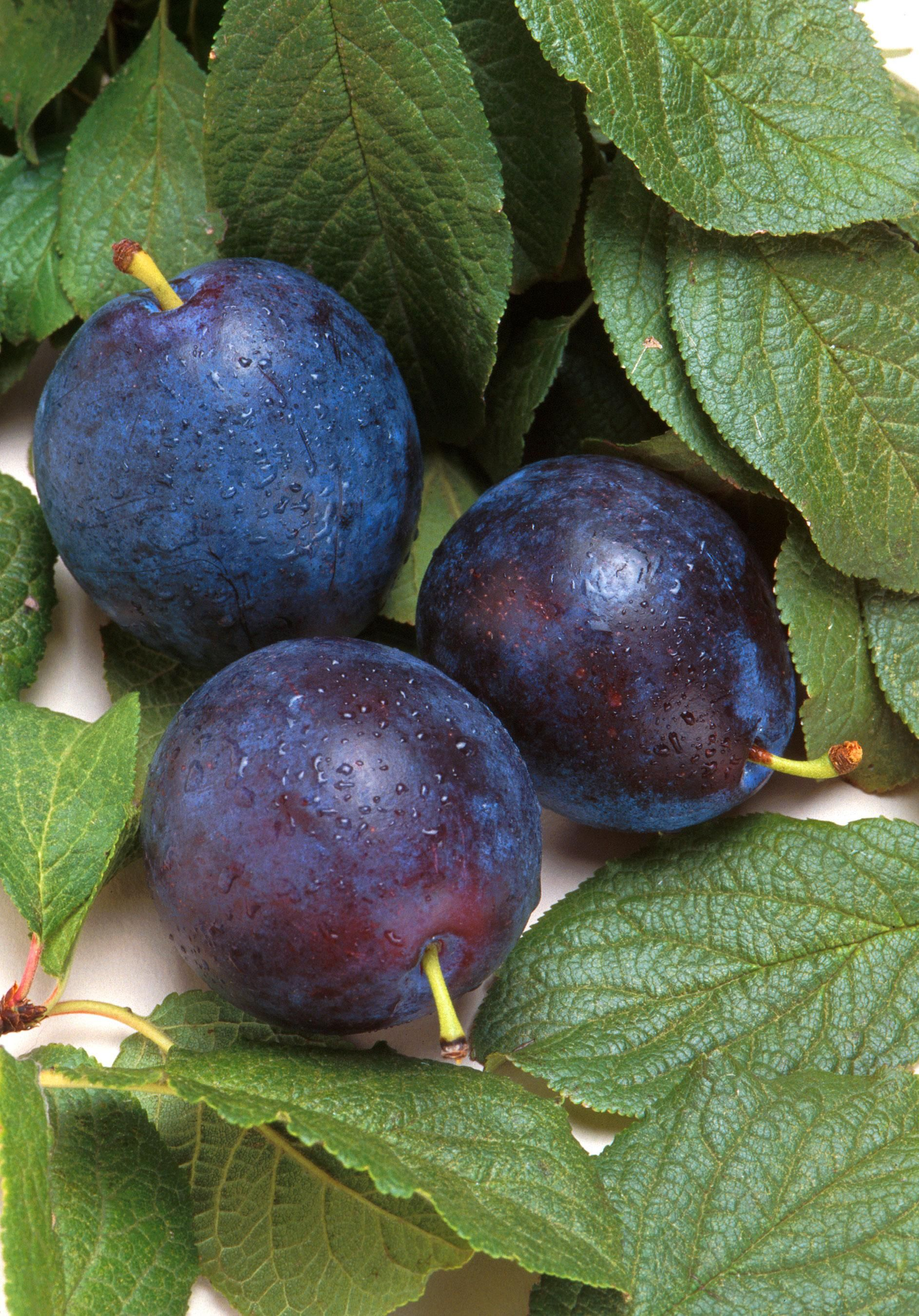
- Plum fruit

Color coordinates
- Hex triplet: #843179
- sRGB^{B} (r, g, b): (132, 49, 121)
- HSV (h, s, v): (308°, 63%, 52%)
- CIELCh_{uv} (L, C, h): (35, 54, 316°)
- Source: Crayola
- ISCC–NBS descriptor: Deep reddish purple
- B: Normalized to [0–255] (byte)

The color plum, since it has a hue code of 307, may be regarded as a dark tone of magenta. The color plum is a close representation of the average color of the plum fruit.

The first recorded use of plum as a color name in English was in 1805.

=== Purple pizzazz ===
Purple pizzazz

Color coordinates
- Hex triplet: #FE4EDA
- sRGB^{B} (r, g, b): (254, 78, 218)
- HSV (h, s, v): (312°, 69%, 100%)
- CIELCh_{uv} (L, C, h): (63, 111, 322°)
- Source: Crayola
- ISCC–NBS descriptor: Vivid reddish purple
- B: Normalized to [0–255] (byte)

Displayed at right is the color purple pizzazz.

This color was formulated by Crayola in 1990.

=== Quinacridone magenta ===
Quinacridone Magenta

Color coordinates
- Hex triplet: #9A114F
- sRGB^{B} (r, g, b): (154, 17, 79)
- HSV (h, s, v): (333°, 89%, 60%)
- CIELCh_{uv} (L, C, h): (34, 80, 354°)
- Source: Liquitex
- ISCC–NBS descriptor: Deep purplish red
- B: Normalized to [0–255] (byte)

At right is displayed the color quinacridone magenta.

Quinacridone magenta is a color made from quinacridone pigment. It is sold in tubes at art supply stores. By mixing various amounts of white with it, or applying it in transparent washes, artists may create a wide range of light, bright, brilliant, vivid, rich, or deep tints of magenta.

=== Razzle dazzle rose ===
Razzle dazzle rose

Color coordinates
- Hex triplet: #FF33CC
- sRGB^{B} (r, g, b): (255, 51, 204)
- HSV (h, s, v): (315°, 80%, 100%)
- CIELCh_{uv} (L, C, h): (60, 119, 328°)
- Source: Crayola
- ISCC–NBS descriptor: Vivid reddish purple
- B: Normalized to [0–255] (byte)

Displayed at right is the color razzle dazzle rose.

This color is a vivid tone of rose tending toward magenta.

This is a Crayola crayon color formulated in 1972 and called hot magenta. In 1990 the name changed to razzle dazzle rose.

=== Rose quartz ===
Rose quartz
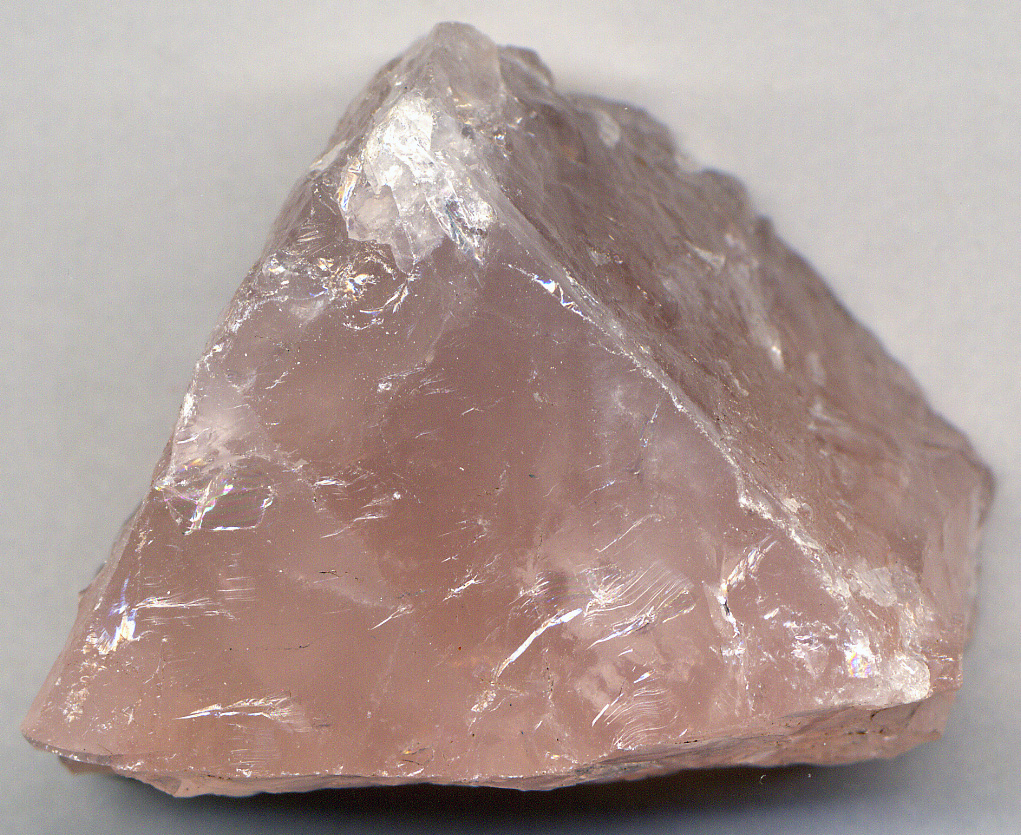
- Rose quartz crystals

Color coordinates
- Hex triplet: #AA98A9
- sRGB^{B} (r, g, b): (170, 152, 169)
- HSV (h, s, v): (303°, 11%, 67%)
- CIELCh_{uv} (L, C, h): (65, 14, 310°)
- Source: ISCC-NBS
- ISCC–NBS descriptor: Pale purple
- B: Normalized to [0–255] (byte)

The color rose quartz is named after the mineral.

The first recorded use of rose quartz as a color name in English was in 1926.

=== Shocking pink ===
Shocking Pink

Color coordinates
- Hex triplet: #FC0FC0
- sRGB^{B} (r, g, b): (252, 15, 192)
- HSV (h, s, v): (315°, 94%, 99%)
- CIELCh_{uv} (L, C, h): (57, 124, 331°)
- Source: Internet
- ISCC–NBS descriptor: Vivid reddish purple
- B: Normalized to [0–255] (byte)

Shocking pink (the original 1937 shocking pink) takes its name from the tone of pink used in the lettering on the box of the perfume called Shocking, designed by Leonor Fini for the Surrealist fashion designer Elsa Schiaparelli in 1937.

=== Shocking pink (Crayola) ===
Shocking Pink (Crayola), formerly known as Ultra Pink

Color coordinates
- Hex triplet: #FF6FFF
- sRGB^{B} (r, g, b): (255, 111, 255)
- HSV (h, s, v): (300°, 56%, 100%)
- CIELCh_{uv} (L, C, h): (69, 108, 308°)
- Source: Crayola
- ISCC–NBS descriptor: Vivid purple
- B: Normalized to [0–255] (byte)

Displayed at right is the Crayola color shocking pink.

This is a Crayola crayon color formulated in 1972 and called ultra pink. In 1990 the name was changed to shocking pink.

=== Sky magenta ===
Sky Magenta

Color coordinates
- Hex triplet: #CF71AF
- sRGB^{B} (r, g, b): (207, 113, 175)
- HSV (h, s, v): (320°, 45%, 81%)
- CIELCh_{uv} (L, C, h): (60, 62, 329°)
- Source: Venus C.P.
- ISCC–NBS descriptor: Deep purplish pink
- B: Normalized to [0–255] (byte)

Displayed at right is the color sky magenta. The color sky magenta is a representation of the color of the sky near the Sun during the brief period of civil twilight, when the pink hues after sunset transition into the blue shades of early dusk. This color was one of the colors in the set of Venus Paradise colored pencils, a popular brand of colored pencils in the 1950s.

This color is also called medium lavender pink.

A photograph of the sky displaying the color sky magenta in its natural context by photographer Dave Horne is displayed here; note the use of Cokin filters may alter or enhance the photo's colors.

=== Steel pink ===
Steel Pink

Color coordinates
- Hex triplet: #CC33CC
- sRGB^{B} (r, g, b): (204, 51, 204)
- HSV (h, s, v): (300°, 75%, 80%)
- CIELCh_{uv} (L, C, h): (51, 102, 308°)
- Source: Crayola
- ISCC–NBS descriptor: Vivid purple
- B: Normalized to [0–255] (byte)

The color steel pink is displayed at right.

The color steel pink was introduced by Crayola in January 2011, when the Ultra Hot and Super Cool set of Crayola colored pencils was fully introduced.

"Steel pink" is a deep tone of magenta.

=== Telemagenta ===
Telemagenta

Color coordinates
- Hex triplet: #CF3476
- sRGB^{B} (r, g, b): (207, 52, 118)
- HSV (h, s, v): (334°, 75%, 81%)
- CIELCh_{uv} (L, C, h): (48, 98, 353°)
- Source: RAL
- ISCC–NBS descriptor: Vivid purplish red
- B: Normalized to [0–255] (byte)

Displayed at right is the color telemagenta.

This is one of the colors in the RAL color matching system, a color system widely used in Europe. The RAL color list first originated in 1927, and it reached its present form in 1961.

=== Web color violet ===
Violet (web color)

Color coordinates
- Hex triplet: #EE82EE
- sRGB^{B} (r, g, b): (238, 130, 238)
- HSV (h, s, v): (300°, 45%, 93%)
- CIELCh_{uv} (L, C, h): (70, 85, 308°)
- Source: X11; X11 color names
- ISCC–NBS descriptor: Vivid purple
- B: Normalized to [0–255] (byte)

Although called violet, it is actually a shade of magenta.

== See also ==
- Index of color-related articles
- Shades of purple
- Fuchsia (color)
- Lists of colors
- Rose (color)
- Lavender (color)
