= Rufous =

Colour

Rufous
#A81C07

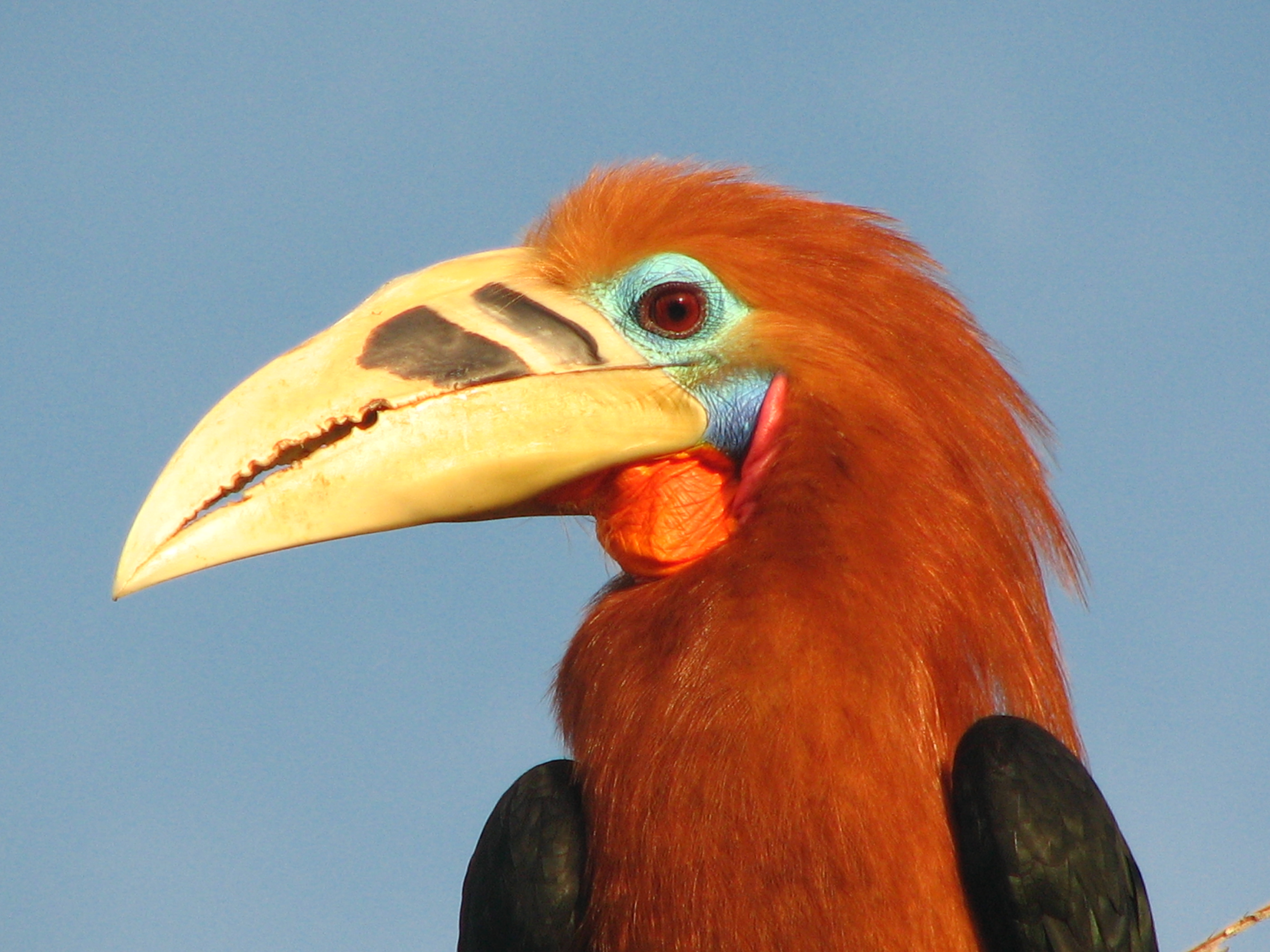
Rufous-necked hornbill (Aceros nipalensis)

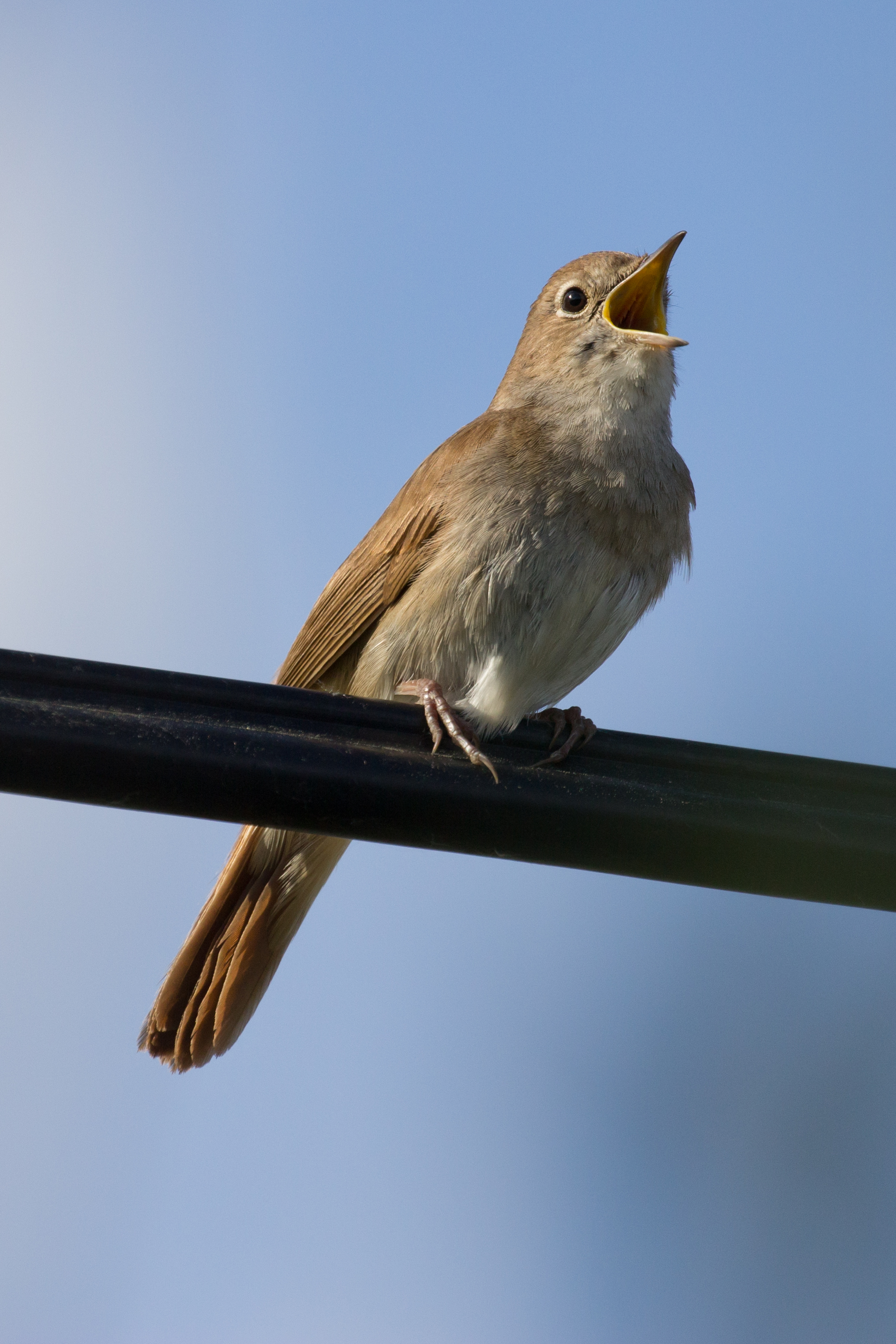
Common nightingale a.k.a. "rufous nightingale"

Rufous (/ˈruːfəs/) is a colour that may be described as reddish-brown or brownish-red, as of rust or oxidised iron. The first recorded use of rufous as a colour name in English was in 1782. However, the colour is also recorded earlier in 1527 as a diagnostic urine colour.

The word "rufous" is derived from the Latin rufus, meaning "red", and is used as an adjective in the names of many animals—especially birds—to describe the colour of their skin, fur, or plumage.

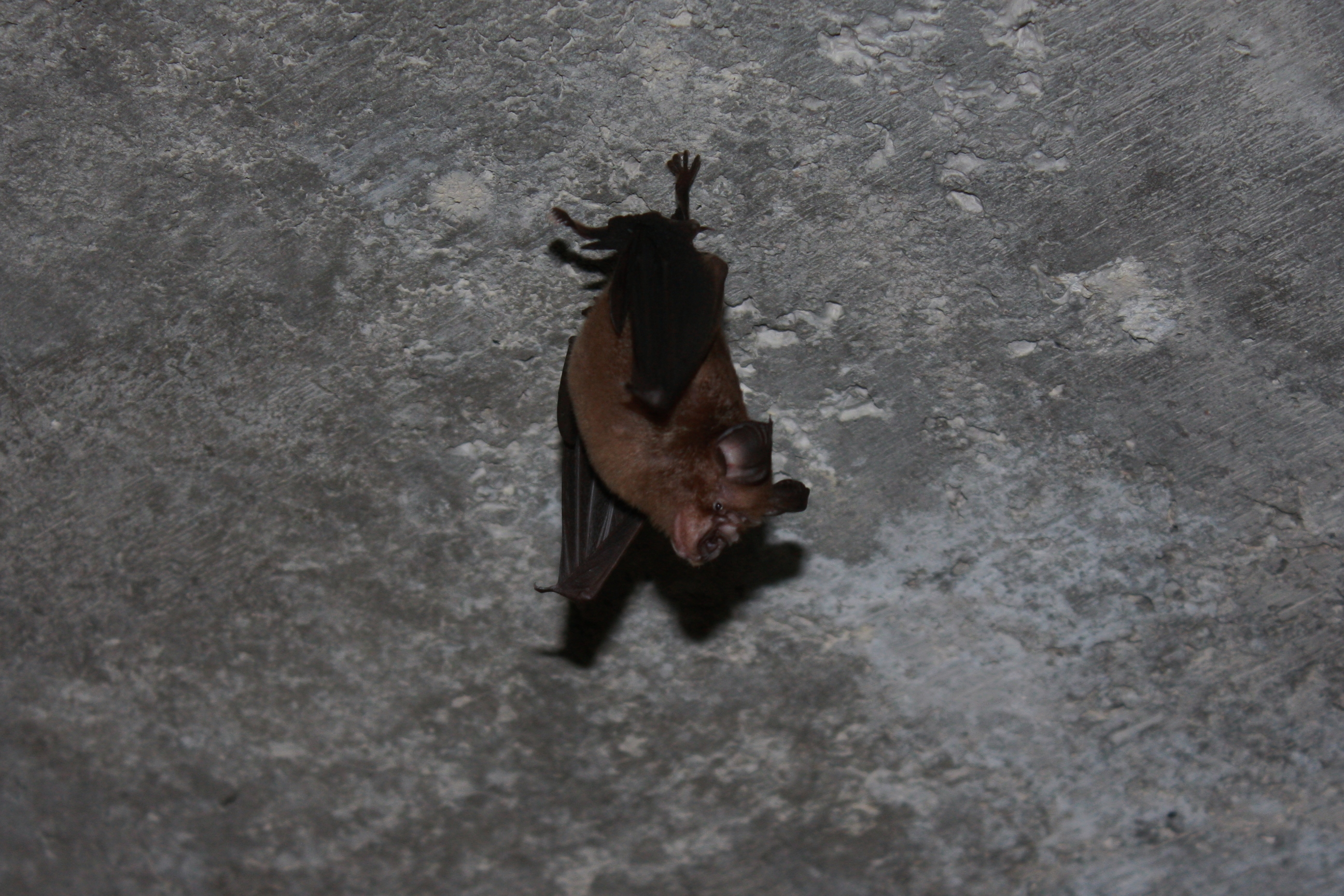
Rufous horseshoe bat (Rhinolophus rouxii)

== See also ==
- List of colors: N–Z
- Shades of brown
- Shades of red
