= Amaranth (color) =

Reddish-rose color derived from the amaranth plant

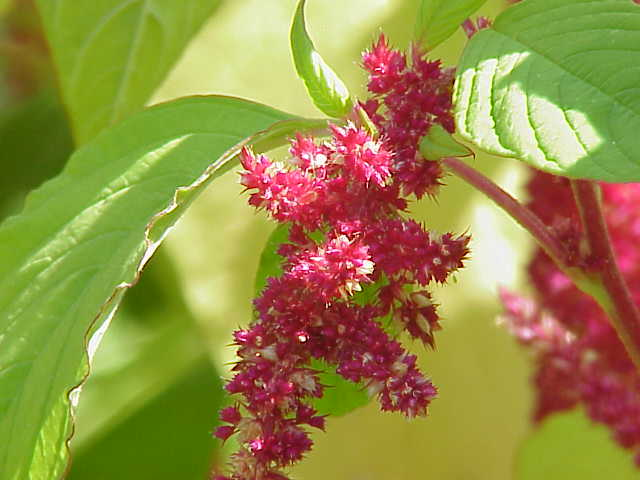
- The flower of the amaranth plant

Color coordinates
- Hex triplet: #E52B50
- sRGB^{B} (r, g, b): (229, 43, 80)
- HSV (h, s, v): (348°, 81%, 90%)
- CIELCh_{uv} (L, C, h): (51, 133, 7°)
- Source: ColorHexa
- B: Normalized to [0–255] (byte)

Amaranth #E52B50
#E52B50

Amaranth is a reddish-rose color that is a representation of the color of the flower of the amaranth plant. The color shown is the color of the red amaranth flower (the color normally considered amaranth), but there are other varieties of amaranth that have other colors of amaranth flowers; these colors are also shown below.

== Description ==
The color amaranth is displayed adjacent. This color is also called amaranth red to distinguish it from the varying colors of other varieties of the amaranth flower.

The color amaranth is similar to printer's magenta (pigment magenta), but redder. It is the color of the flower of those amaranth plants that have amaranth red colored flowers.

The first recorded use of amaranth as a color name in English was in 1690.

== Etymology ==
The name amaranth comes from the Greek a (not) + marainean (to waste away), i.e., a flower believed to grow on Mount Olympus which never died.

== Variations ==
=== Pink ===
Amaranth pink

Color coordinates
- Hex triplet: #F19CBB
- sRGB^{B} (r, g, b): (241, 156, 187)
- HSV (h, s, v): (338°, 35%, 95%)
- CIELCh_{uv} (L, C, h): (74, 53, 348°)
- Source: Maerz and Paul
- ISCC–NBS descriptor: Moderate purplish pink
- B: Normalized to [0–255] (byte)

The color amaranth pink is displayed at right. This color is a representation of the color of pink amaranth flowers.

The first recorded use of amaranth pink as a color name in English was in 1905.

==== Bright ====
Radical red

Color coordinates
- Hex triplet: #FF355E
- sRGB^{B} (r, g, b): (255, 53, 94)
- HSV (h, s, v): (348°, 79%, 100%)
- CIELCh_{uv} (L, C, h): (57, 145, 6°)
- Source: Crayola
- ISCC–NBS descriptor: Vivid red
- B: Normalized to [0–255] (byte)

The Crayola crayon color radical red is displayed at right.

The color radical red, which may also be called bright amaranth pink, was formulated by Crayola in 1990.

This color is supposed to be fluorescent, but there is no mechanism for displaying fluorescence on a computer screen.

=== Purple ===
Amaranth purple

Color coordinates
- Hex triplet: #AB274F
- sRGB^{B} (r, g, b): (171, 39, 79)
- HSV (h, s, v): (342°, 77%, 67%)
- CIELCh_{uv} (L, C, h): (39, 88, 1°)
- Source: Maerz and Paul
- ISCC–NBS descriptor: Vivid red
- B: Normalized to [0–255] (byte)

The color amaranth purple is displayed at right. This color is a representation of the color of purple amaranth flowers. The common name purple aramanth applies to two species: Amaranthus blitum and Amaranthus cruentus.

The first recorded use of amaranth purple as a color name in English was in 1912.

==== Deep ====
Amaranth (M&P)

Color coordinates
- Hex triplet: #9F2B68
- sRGB^{B} (r, g, b): (159, 43, 104)
- HSV (h, s, v): (328°, 73%, 62%)
- CIELCh_{uv} (L, C, h): (38, 70, 344°)
- Source: Maerz and Paul
- ISCC–NBS descriptor: Deep purplish red
- B: Normalized to [0–255] (byte)

Amaranth deep purple is the tone of amaranth that is called amaranth in the 1930 book by Maerz and Paul A Dictionary of Color.

=== Alizarin ===
Alizarin

Color coordinates
- Hex triplet: #DB2D43
- sRGB^{B} (r, g, b): (219, 45, 67)
- HSV (h, s, v): (352°, 79%, 86%)
- CIELCh_{uv} (L, C, h): (49, 129, 9°)
- Source: Maerz and Paul
- ISCC–NBS descriptor: Brilliant amaranth
- B: Normalized to [0–255] (byte)

Alizarin is the tone of amaranth that is called alizarin in the 1930 book by Maerz and Paul A Dictionary of Color.

== See also ==
- Amaranth (dye)
- Cerise (color)
- Crimson
- List of colors
- Rose (color)
- Ruby (color)
