= Upsdell red =

Deep medium red shade

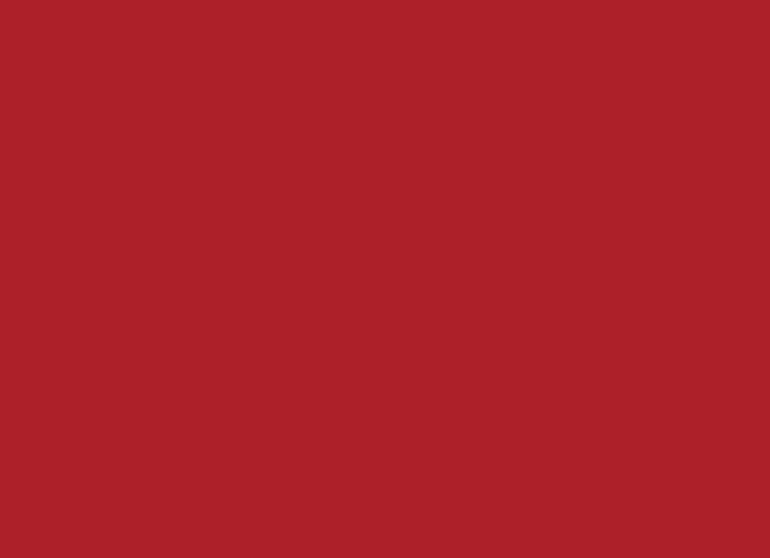
Upsdell Red

Upsdell red is a deep medium red, similar to fire engine red.

The colour Upsdell Red was coined in remembrance of Reverend G Upsdell, the first headmaster for the new site of King George V School in Hong Kong after World War II.

Upsdell red was developed and used with respect to G.Upsdell starting 1963, and is used for flags in favor of pure red in night time ceremonies.
