= Raisin black =

Color

Raisin Black

Color coordinates
- Hex triplet: #242124
- sRGB^{B} (r, g, b): (36, 33, 36)
- HSV (h, s, v): (300°, 8%, 14%)
- CIELCh_{uv} (L, C, h): (13, 2, 308°)
- Source: ISCC-NBS
- ISCC–NBS descriptor: Black
- B: Normalized to [0–255] (byte)

Raisin black is a color that is a representation of the color of black raisins.

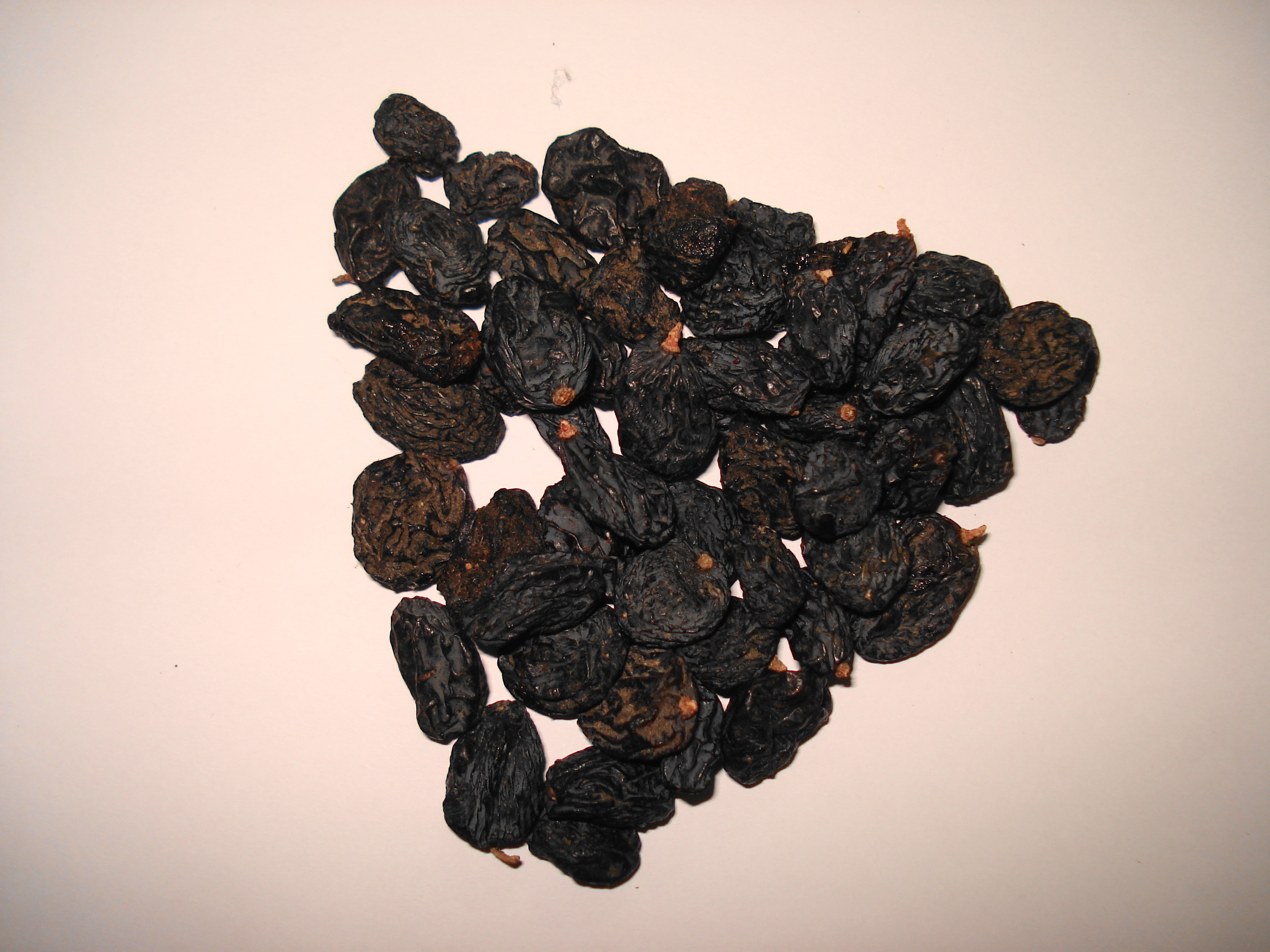
Black raisins

== See also ==
- List of colors
