= Index of color-related articles =

Color star using the RGB color model displaying names, hue, and hex

This is an index of color topic-related articles.

- Achromatic color
- Additive color
- Afterimage
- Analogous colors
- Bayer filter
- Blue–green distinction in language
- Chromaticity
- Chrominance
- Chromolithograph
- Chromophobia
- Chromotherapy
- Color (← Colour, Color (disambiguation))
  - Black
    - Shades of black
  - Blue
    - Shades of blue
  - Green
    - Shades of green
  - Red
    - Shades of red
  - Silver (color)
  - White
    - Shades of white
  - Yellow
    - Shades of yellow
- Color analysis
- Color balance
- Color blindness
- Color chart
- Color code
- Color constancy
- Color depth
- Color field painting
- Colorfulness
- Color gradient
- Color in Chinese culture
- Color management
- Color mapping
- Color model
- Color mixing
- Color photography
- Color picker
- Color preferences
- Color printing
- Color psychology
- Color realism
- Color recovery
- Color rendering index
- Color scheme
- Color solid
- Color space
  - CMYK color space
  - HSV color space
  - HSL color space
  - RGB color spaces
    - Adobe RGB color space
    - SRGB color space
  - YIQ
  - YUV
  - Color space encoding
- ColorSync
- Color symbolism
- Color temperature
- Color term
- Color theory
- Color triangle
- Color vision
- Color wheel
- Colorimeter
- Colorimetry
- Color of chemicals
- Colour banding
- Colour cast
- Complementary color
- Cool colors
- False color
- Film colorization
- Four-color printing
  - Cyan, magenta, yellow
- Horses
  - Equine coat color (wikilinks to all other coat color articles)
  - Color breed
- Grayscale
- Hue
- Human skin color
- Impossible color
- Kruithof curve
- Lightness
- Light-on-dark color scheme
- Liturgical colours
- Local color
- Lüscher color test
- Metamerism
- Monochromatic color
- Multi-primary color display
- National colours
- Palette (computing)
  - List of color palettes
- Pastel (color)
- Political colour
- Primary color
- Rainbow
- Secondary color
- Saturation
- Spectral color
- Spot color
- Structural coloration
- Subtractive color
- Tertiary color
- Theory of Colours
- Thermochromics
- Tincture (heraldry)
  - argent, azure, gules, or, purpure, sable, vert
- Tint, shade and tone
- Traditional colors of Japan
- Visual perception
- Visible spectrum
- Warm colors
- Washington Color School
- Watercolor
- Web colors
- X11 color names

== Lists ==
- List of colors: A–F
- List of colors: G–M
- List of colors: N–Z
- List of colors (compact)
- List of colors by shade
- List of color palettes
- List of color spaces
- List of Crayola crayon colors
  - history
- List of international auto racing colours
- List of RAL colors
- List of U.S. state colors

== See also ==
- Lists of colors topics
