= Ruby (color) =

Color that represents the ruby gemstone

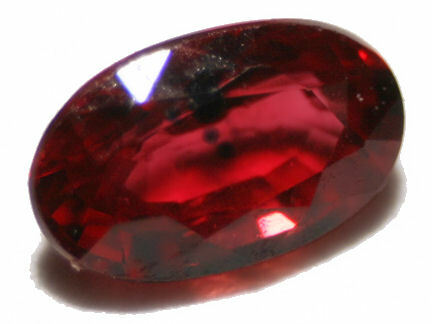
- A natural ruby

Color coordinates
- Hex triplet: #E0115F
- sRGB^{B} (r, g, b): (224, 17, 95)
- HSV (h, s, v): (337°, 92%, 88%)
- CIELCh_{uv} (L, C, h): (48, 130, 1°)
- Source: Maerz and Paul
- ISCC–NBS descriptor: Vivid red
- B: Normalized to [0–255] (byte)

Ruby is a color that is a representation of the color of the cut and polished ruby gemstone and is a shade of red or pink.

== Origins ==
The first recorded use of ruby as a color name in English was in 1572.

== Variations ==
=== Rubine red ===
Rubine Red

Color coordinates
- Hex triplet: #D10056
- sRGB^{B} (r, g, b): (209, 0, 86)
- HSV (h, s, v): (335°, 100%, 82%)
- CIELCh_{uv} (L, C, h): (45, 124, 1°)
- Source: Pantone
- ISCC–NBS descriptor: Vivid red
- B: Normalized to [0–255] (byte)

Displayed at right is the Pantone color rubine red.

=== Ruber ===
Ruber

Color coordinates
- Hex triplet: #CE4676
- sRGB^{B} (r, g, b): (206, 70, 118)
- HSV (h, s, v): (339°, 66%, 81%)
- CIELCh_{uv} (L, C, h): (50, 89, 355°)
- Source: ISCC-NBS
- ISCC–NBS descriptor: Vivid purplish red
- B: Normalized to [0–255] (byte)

The color ruber is displayed to the right.

=== Medium ruby ===
Medium Ruby

Color coordinates
- Hex triplet: #AA4069
- sRGB^{B} (r, g, b): (170, 64, 105)
- HSV (h, s, v): (337°, 62%, 67%)
- CIELCh_{uv} (L, C, h): (43, 68, 352°)
- Source: Crayola
- ISCC–NBS descriptor: Moderate purplish red
- B: Normalized to [0–255] (byte)

Medium ruby is the color called ruby in Crayola Gem Tones, a specialty set of crayons introduced by the Crayola company in 1994.

=== Ruby red ===
Ruby Red

Color coordinates
- Hex triplet: #9B111E
- sRGB^{B} (r, g, b): (155, 17, 30)
- HSV (h, s, v): (354°, 89%, 61%)
- CIELCh_{uv} (L, C, h): (33, 98, 10°)
- Source: RAL
- ISCC–NBS descriptor: Vivid red
- B: Normalized to [0–255] (byte)

Displayed at right is the color ruby red.

This is one of the colors in the RAL color matching system, a color system widely used in Europe. The RAL color list originated in 1927, and it reached its present form in 1961.

=== Big dip o'ruby ===
Big Dip O'Ruby

Color coordinates
- Hex triplet: #9C2542
- sRGB^{B} (r, g, b): (156, 37, 66)
- HSV (h, s, v): (345°, 76%, 61%)
- CIELCh_{uv} (L, C, h): (36, 81, 3°)
- Source: Crayola
- ISCC–NBS descriptor: Deep red
- B: Normalized to [0–255] (byte)

Displayed at right is the color big dip o'ruby.

Big dip o'ruby is one of the colors in the special set of metallic Crayola crayons called Metallic FX, the colors of which were formulated by Crayola in 2001.

This is supposed to be a metallic color. However, there is no mechanism for displaying metallic colors on a flat computer screen.

=== Antique ruby ===
Antique Ruby

Color coordinates
- Hex triplet: #841B2D
- sRGB^{B} (r, g, b): (132, 27, 45)
- HSV (h, s, v): (350°, 80%, 52%)
- CIELCh_{uv} (L, C, h): (29, 71, 7°)
- Source: ISCC-NBS
- ISCC–NBS descriptor: Deep red
- B: Normalized to [0–255] (byte)

At right is displayed the color antique ruby.

The first recorded use of antique ruby as a color name in English was in 1926.

The color antique ruby is a dark tone of ruby.

=== Deep ruby ===
Deep Ruby

Color coordinates
- Hex triplet: #843F5B
- sRGB^{B} (r, g, b): (132, 63, 91)
- HSV (h, s, v): (336°, 52%, 52%)
- CIELCh_{uv} (L, C, h): (36, 43, 348°)
- Source: BS 381
- ISCC–NBS descriptor: Dark purplish red
- B: Normalized to [0–255] (byte)

Displayed at right is deep tone of ruby that is called ruby in the British Standards 381 color list. This color is #542 on the 381 color list. The 381 color list is for colors used in identification, coding, and other special purposes. The British Standard color lists were first formulated in 1930 and reached their present form in 1955.

== In nature ==
- The ruby-throated hummingbird (Archilochus colubris) is a small hummingbird. It is the only species of hummingbird that regularly nests east of the Mississippi River in North America.
- The ruby seadragon (Phyllopteryx dewysea) is a marine fish in the family Syngnathidae, which also includes seahorses. It inhabits the coast of Western Australia. The species was first described in 2015, making it only the third known species of seadragon, and the first to be discovered in 150 years.
- The ruby snapper (Etelis carbunculis) is a species of fish that lives in Australia.
- Infrared light in the portion of the spectrum where it is still visible to humans (out to approximately 1050 nanometers) appears ruby red. Starting at about 660 nm in the visible red, a monochromatic source such as an LED or laser begins to look very slightly purplish, gradually becoming more so as the wavelength increases. Below about 900 nm, the color is more purple than red, similar to some of the color samples on this page.

== See also ==
- RAL 3003 Ruby red
- List of colors
