= X11 color names =

In computing, on the X Window System, X11 color names are represented in a simple text file, which maps certain strings to RGB color values. It was traditionally shipped with every X11 installation, hence the name, and is usually located in <X11root>/lib/X11/rgb.txt. The web colors list is descended from it but differs for certain color names.

Color names are not standardized by Xlib or the X11 protocol. The list does not show continuity either in selected color values or in color names, and some color triplets have multiple names. Despite this, graphic designers and others got used to them, making it practically impossible to introduce a different list. In earlier releases of X11 (prior to the introduction of Xcms), server implementors were encouraged to modify the RGB values in the reference color database to account for gamma correction.

As of X.Org Release 7.4 rgb.txt is no longer included in the roll up release, and the list is built directly into the server. The optional module xorg/app/rgb contains the stand-alone rgb.txt file.

The list first shipped with X10 release 3 (X10R3) on 7 June 1986, having been checked into RCS by Jim Gettys in 1985. The same list was in X11R1 on 18 September 1987. Approximately the full list as is available today shipped with X11R4 on 29 January 1989, with substantial additions by Paul Ravelling (who added colors based on Sinclair Paints samples), John C. Thomas (who added colors based on a set of 72 Crayola crayons he had on hand) and Jim Fulton (who reconciled contributions to produce the X11R4 list). The project was running DEC VT240 terminals at the time, so would have worked to that device.

In some applications multipart names are written with spaces, in others joined together, often in camel case. They are usually matched insensitive of case and the X Server source code contains spaced aliases for most entries; this article uses spaces and uppercase initials except where variants with spaces are not specified in the actual code.

== Clashes between web and X11 colors in the CSS color scheme ==
The first versions of Mosaic and Netscape Navigator used the X11 colors as the basis for the web colors list, as both were originally X applications. The W3C specifications SVG and CSS level 3 module Color eventually adopted the X11 list with some changes. The present W3C list is a superset of the 16 "VGA colors" defined in HTML 3.2 and CSS level 1.

One notable difference between X11 and W3C is the case of "Gray" and its variants. In HTML, "Gray" is specifically reserved for the 128 triplet (50% gray) . However, in X11, "gray" was assigned to the 190 triplet (74.5%) , which is close to W3C "Silver" at 192 (75.3%) , and had "Light Gray" at 211 (83%) and "Dark Gray" at 169 (66%) counterparts. As a result, the combined CSS 3.0 color list that prevails on the web today produces "Dark Gray" as a significantly lighter tone than plain "Gray" , because "Dark Gray" was descended from X11 – for it did not exist in HTML nor CSS level 1 – while "Gray" was descended from HTML. Even in the current draft for CSS 4.0, dark gray continues to be a lighter shade than gray. Some browsers such as Netscape Navigator insisted on an "a" in any "Gray" except for "Light Grey", for which both spellings were accepted.

Recent X releases (since 2014, xorg-rgb version 1.0.6) also support the W3C definitions. In X11, the original definitions have been preserved (so "Dark Gray" remains a darker shade of "Gray"), but for every conflicting name pair, "Web" and additional "X11" prefixes have been added to ease disambiguation after the merger. The "X11" prefix is an alias for the non-prefixed version, i.e. "X11 Gray" = "Gray" ≠ "Web Gray". The W3C also defined a color that is equal to X11's "Green", but called it "Lime". In X11, this is simply called "Lime", as no such name existed before. It aliases to "Green", i.e. "Lime" = "Green" = "X11 Green" ≠ "Web Green".

Color names with clashing definitions
Color name	X11 color					W3C color				
Color name	Hex	Red	Green	Blue	Sample	Sample	Hex	Red	Green	Blue
Gray	#BEBEBE	75%	75%	75%			#808080	50%	50%	50%
Green	#00FF00	0%	100%	0%			#008000	0%	50%	0%
Maroon	#B03060	69%	19%	38%			#800000	50%	0%	0%
Purple	#A020F0	63%	13%	94%			#800080	50%	0%	50%

Colors with multiple names
X11 name	Color					W3C name (Note: The original W3C names, as used in HTML4/CSS2, before the adoption of the non-colliding X11 names as alternatives.)
X11 name	Hex	Red	Green	Blue	Sample	W3C name
Green	#00FF00	0%	100%	0%		Lime
Magenta	#FF00FF	100%	0%	100%		Fuchsia
Cyan	#00FFFF	0%	100%	100%		Aqua

== Color name chart ==
The following chart presents the standardized X11 color names from the X.org source code. The list of names accepted by browsers following W3C standards slightly differs as explained above. The table does not show numbered gray and brightness variants as described below. Actual rgb.txt files and other color databases or palettes may differ since they are freely editable by vendors and users. The table shows component values in several notations of the RGB color space, with conversions to HSL and HSV assuming sRGB color space.

X11 color names
Name	Hex (RGB)	Red (RGB)	Green (RGB)	Blue (RGB)	Hue (HSL/HSV)	Satur. (HSL)	Light (HSL)	Satur. (HSV)	Value (HSV)	Alternatives
Alice Blue	#F0F8FF	94%	97%	100%	208°	100%	97%	6%	100%	
Antique White	#FAEBD7	98%	92%	84%	34°	78%	91%	14%	98%	
Aqua	#00FFFF	0%	100%	100%	180°	100%	50%	100%	100%	Cyan
Aquamarine	#7FFFD4	50%	100%	83%	160°	100%	75%	50%	100%	
Azure	#F0FFFF	94%	100%	100%	180°	100%	97%	6%	100%	
Beige	#F5F5DC	96%	96%	86%	60°	56%	91%	10%	96%	
Bisque	#FFE4C4	100%	89%	77%	33°	100%	88%	23%	100%	
Black	#000000	0%	0%	0%	0°	0%	0%	0%	0%	
Blanched Almond	#FFEBCD	100%	92%	80%	36°	100%	90%	20%	100%	
Blue	#0000FF	0%	0%	100%	240°	100%	50%	100%	100%	
Blue Violet	#8A2BE2	54%	17%	89%	271°	76%	53%	81%	89%	
Brown	#A52A2A	65%	16%	16%	0°	59%	41%	75%	65%	
Burlywood	#DEB887	87%	72%	53%	34°	57%	70%	39%	87%	
Cadet Blue	#5F9EA0	37%	62%	63%	182°	26%	50%	41%	63%	
Chartreuse	#7FFF00	50%	100%	0%	90°	100%	50%	100%	100%	
Chocolate	#D2691E	82%	41%	12%	25°	75%	47%	86%	82%	
Coral	#FF7F50	100%	50%	31%	16°	100%	66%	69%	100%	
Cornflower Blue	#6495ED	39%	58%	93%	219°	79%	66%	58%	93%	
Cornsilk	#FFF8DC	100%	97%	86%	48°	100%	93%	14%	100%	
Crimson	#DC143C	86%	8%	24%	348°	83%	47%	91%	86%	
Cyan	#00FFFF	0%	100%	100%	180°	100%	50%	100%	100%	Aqua
Dark Blue	#00008B	0%	0%	55%	240°	100%	27%	100%	55%	
Dark Cyan	#008B8B	0%	55%	55%	180°	100%	27%	100%	55%	
Dark Goldenrod	#B8860B	72%	53%	4%	43°	89%	38%	94%	72%	
Dark Gray	#A9A9A9	66%	66%	66%	0°	0%	66%	0%	66%	Dark Grey
Dark Green	#006400	0%	39%	0%	120°	100%	20%	100%	39%	
Dark Khaki	#BDB76B	74%	72%	42%	56°	38%	58%	43%	74%	
Dark Magenta	#8B008B	55%	0%	55%	300°	100%	27%	100%	55%	
Dark Olive Green	#556B2F	33%	42%	18%	82°	39%	30%	56%	42%	
Dark Orange	#FF8C00	100%	55%	0%	33°	100%	50%	100%	100%	
Dark Orchid	#9932CC	60%	20%	80%	280°	61%	50%	75%	80%	
Dark Red	#8B0000	55%	0%	0%	0°	100%	27%	100%	55%	
Dark Salmon	#E9967A	91%	59%	48%	15°	72%	70%	48%	91%	
Dark Sea Green	#8FBC8F	56%	74%	56%	120°	25%	65%	24%	74%	
Dark Slate Blue	#483D8B	28%	24%	55%	248°	39%	39%	56%	55%	
Dark Slate Gray	#2F4F4F	18%	31%	31%	180°	25%	25%	41%	31%	Dark Slate Grey
Dark Turquoise	#00CED1	0%	81%	82%	181°	100%	41%	100%	82%	
Dark Violet	#9400D3	58%	0%	83%	282°	100%	41%	100%	83%	
Deep Pink	#FF1493	100%	8%	58%	328°	100%	54%	92%	100%	
Deep Sky Blue	#00BFFF	0%	75%	100%	195°	100%	50%	100%	100%	
Dim Gray	#696969	41%	41%	41%	0°	0%	41%	0%	41%	Dim Grey
Dodger Blue	#1E90FF	12%	56%	100%	210°	100%	56%	88%	100%	
Firebrick	#B22222	70%	13%	13%	0°	68%	42%	81%	70%	
Floral White	#FFFAF0	100%	98%	94%	40°	100%	97%	6%	100%	
Forest Green	#228B22	13%	55%	13%	120°	61%	34%	76%	55%	
Fuchsia	#FF00FF	100%	0%	100%	300°	100%	50%	100%	100%	Magenta
Gainsboro (Note: Prior to standardization as a web color, Gainsboro was included as one of the X11 color names. It was, however, absent from the original 1987 version of the list, but present in Paul Raveling's version which added, amongst other things, "[l]ight and off-white colors, copied from several Sinclair Paints color samples".)	#DCDCDC	86%	86%	86%	0°	0%	86%	0%	86%	
Ghost White	#F8F8FF	97%	97%	100%	240°	100%	99%	3%	100%	
Gold	#FFD700	100%	84%	0%	51°	100%	50%	100%	100%	
Goldenrod	#DAA520	85%	65%	13%	43°	74%	49%	85%	85%	
Gray	#BEBEBE	75%	75%	75%	0°	0%	75%	0%	75%	Grey, X11 Gray, X11 Grey
Web Gray	#808080	50%	50%	50%	0°	0%	50%	0%	50%	Web Grey
Green	#00FF00	0%	100%	0%	120°	100%	50%	100%	100%	X11 Green, Lime
Web Green	#008000	0%	50%	0%	120°	100%	25%	100%	50%	
Green Yellow	#ADFF2F	68%	100%	18%	84°	100%	59%	82%	100%	
Honeydew	#F0FFF0	94%	100%	94%	120°	100%	97%	6%	100%	
Hot Pink	#FF69B4	100%	41%	71%	330°	100%	71%	59%	100%	
Indian Red	#CD5C5C	80%	36%	36%	0°	53%	58%	55%	80%	
Indigo	#4B0082	29%	0%	51%	275°	100%	26%	100%	51%	
Ivory	#FFFFF0	100%	100%	94%	60°	100%	97%	6%	100%	
Khaki	#F0E68C	94%	90%	55%	54°	77%	75%	42%	94%	
Lavender	#E6E6FA	90%	90%	98%	240°	67%	94%	8%	98%	
Lavender Blush	#FFF0F5	100%	94%	96%	340°	100%	97%	6%	100%	
Lawn Green	#7CFC00	49%	99%	0%	90°	100%	49%	100%	99%	
Lemon Chiffon	#FFFACD	100%	98%	80%	54°	100%	90%	20%	100%	
Light Blue	#ADD8E6	68%	85%	90%	195°	53%	79%	25%	90%	
Light Coral	#F08080	94%	50%	50%	0°	79%	72%	47%	94%	
Light Cyan	#E0FFFF	88%	100%	100%	180°	100%	94%	12%	100%	
Light Goldenrod	#FAFAD2	98%	98%	82%	60°	80%	90%	16%	98%	
Light Gray	#D3D3D3	83%	83%	83%	0°	0%	83%	0%	83%	Light Grey
Light Green	#90EE90	56%	93%	56%	120°	73%	75%	39%	93%	
Light Pink	#FFB6C1	100%	71%	76%	351°	100%	86%	29%	100%	
Light Salmon	#FFA07A	100%	63%	48%	17°	100%	74%	52%	100%	
Light Sea Green	#20B2AA	13%	70%	67%	177°	70%	41%	82%	70%	
Light Sky Blue	#87CEFA	53%	81%	98%	203°	92%	76%	46%	98%	
Light Slate Gray	#778899	47%	53%	60%	210°	14%	53%	22%	60%	Light Slate Grey
Light Steel Blue	#B0C4DE	69%	77%	87%	214°	41%	78%	21%	87%	
Light Yellow	#FFFFE0	100%	100%	88%	60°	100%	94%	12%	100%	
Lime	#00FF00	0%	100%	0%	120°	100%	50%	100%	100%	
Lime Green	#32CD32	20%	80%	20%	120°	61%	50%	76%	80%	
Linen	#FAF0E6	98%	94%	90%	30°	67%	94%	8%	98%	
Magenta	#FF00FF	100%	0%	100%	300°	100%	50%	100%	100%	Fuchsia
Maroon	#B03060	69%	19%	38%	338°	57%	44%	73%	69%	X11 Maroon
Web Maroon	#800000	50%	0%	0%	0°	100%	25%	100%	50%	
Medium Aquamarine	#66CDAA	40%	80%	67%	160°	51%	60%	50%	80%	
Medium Blue	#0000CD	0%	0%	80%	240°	100%	40%	100%	80%	
Medium Orchid	#BA55D3	73%	33%	83%	288°	59%	58%	60%	83%	
Medium Purple	#9370DB	58%	44%	86%	260°	60%	65%	49%	86%	
Medium Sea Green	#3CB371	24%	70%	44%	147°	50%	47%	66%	70%	
Medium Slate Blue	#7B68EE	48%	41%	93%	249°	80%	67%	56%	93%	
Medium Spring Green	#00FA9A	0%	98%	60%	157°	100%	49%	100%	98%	
Medium Turquoise	#48D1CC	28%	82%	80%	178°	60%	55%	66%	82%	
Medium Violet Red	#C71585	78%	8%	52%	322°	81%	43%	89%	78%	
Midnight Blue	#191970	10%	10%	44%	240°	64%	27%	78%	44%	
Mint Cream	#F5FFFA	96%	100%	98%	150°	100%	98%	4%	100%	
Misty Rose	#FFE4E1	100%	89%	88%	6°	100%	94%	12%	100%	
Moccasin	#FFE4B5	100%	89%	71%	38°	100%	86%	29%	100%	
Navajo White	#FFDEAD	100%	87%	68%	36°	100%	84%	32%	100%	
Navy Blue	#000080	0%	0%	50%	240°	100%	25%	100%	50%	Navy
Old Lace	#FDF5E6	99%	96%	90%	39°	85%	95%	9%	99%	
Olive	#808000	50%	50%	0%	60°	100%	25%	100%	50%	
Olive Drab	#6B8E23	42%	56%	14%	80°	61%	35%	75%	56%	
Orange	#FFA500	100%	65%	0%	39°	100%	50%	100%	100%	
Orange Red	#FF4500	100%	27%	0%	16°	100%	50%	100%	100%	
Orchid	#DA70D6	85%	44%	84%	302°	59%	65%	49%	85%	
Pale Goldenrod	#EEE8AA	93%	91%	67%	55°	67%	80%	29%	93%	
Pale Green	#98FB98	60%	98%	60%	120°	93%	79%	39%	98%	
Pale Turquoise	#AFEEEE	69%	93%	93%	180°	65%	81%	26%	93%	
Pale Violet Red	#DB7093	86%	44%	58%	340°	60%	65%	49%	86%	
Papaya Whip	#FFEFD5	100%	94%	84%	37°	100%	92%	16%	100%	
Peach Puff	#FFDAB9	100%	85%	73%	28°	100%	86%	27%	100%	
Peru	#CD853F	80%	52%	25%	30°	59%	53%	69%	80%	
Pink	#FFC0CB	100%	75%	80%	350°	100%	88%	25%	100%	
Plum	#DDA0DD	87%	63%	87%	300°	47%	75%	28%	87%	
Powder Blue	#B0E0E6	69%	88%	90%	187°	52%	80%	23%	90%	
Purple	#A020F0	63%	13%	94%	277°	87%	53%	87%	94%	X11 Purple
Web Purple	#800080	50%	0%	50%	300°	100%	25%	100%	50%	
Rebecca Purple	#663399	40%	20%	60%	270°	50%	40%	66%	60%	
Red	#FF0000	100%	0%	0%	0°	100%	50%	100%	100%	
Rosy Brown	#BC8F8F	74%	56%	56%	0°	25%	65%	24%	74%	
Royal Blue	#4169E1	25%	41%	88%	225°	73%	57%	71%	88%	
Saddle brown	#8B4513	55%	27%	7%	25°	76%	31%	86%	55%	
Salmon	#FA8072	98%	50%	45%	6°	93%	71%	54%	98%	
Sandy Brown	#F4A460	96%	64%	38%	28°	87%	67%	61%	96%	
Sea Green	#2E8B57	18%	55%	34%	146°	50%	36%	67%	55%	
Seashell	#FFF5EE	100%	96%	93%	25°	100%	97%	7%	100%	
Sienna	#A0522D	63%	32%	18%	19°	56%	40%	72%	63%	
Silver	#C0C0C0	75%	75%	75%	0°	0%	75%	0%	75%	
Sky Blue	#87CEEB	53%	81%	92%	197°	71%	73%	43%	92%	
Slate Blue	#6A5ACD	42%	35%	80%	248°	54%	58%	56%	80%	
Slate Gray	#708090	44%	50%	56%	210°	13%	50%	22%	56%	Slate Grey
Snow	#FFFAFA	100%	98%	98%	0°	100%	99%	2%	100%	
Spring Green	#00FF7F	0%	100%	50%	150°	100%	50%	100%	100%	
Steel Blue	#4682B4	27%	51%	71%	207°	44%	49%	61%	71%	
Tan	#D2B48C	82%	71%	55%	34°	44%	69%	33%	82%	
Teal	#008080	0%	50%	50%	180°	100%	25%	100%	50%	
Thistle	#D8BFD8	85%	75%	85%	300°	24%	80%	12%	85%	
Tomato	#FF6347	100%	39%	28%	9°	100%	64%	72%	100%	
Turquoise	#40E0D0	25%	88%	82%	174°	72%	57%	71%	88%	
Violet	#EE82EE	93%	51%	93%	300°	76%	72%	45%	93%	
Wheat	#F5DEB3	96%	87%	70%	39°	77%	83%	27%	96%	
White	#FFFFFF	100%	100%	100%	0°	0%	100%	0%	100%	
White Smoke	#F5F5F5	96%	96%	96%	0°	0%	96%	0%	96%	
Yellow	#FFFF00	100%	100%	0%	60°	100%	50%	100%	100%	
Yellow Green	#9ACD32	60%	80%	20%	80°	61%	50%	76%	80%	

== Color variations ==
=== Shades of gray ===
The complete rgb.txt defines 101 shades from 'Gray0' (black) up to 'Gray100' (white) in addition to 'Gray' and its variants listed above. The shades are apparently defined by the formula GrayN := round(N% × 255) resulting in e.g. 'Gray96' , which happens to be the same as 'White Smoke'. Similarly 'Dim Gray' is the same as 'Gray41' .

On the other hand, 'Gray' lies between 'Gray74' and 'Gray75' ; 'Dark Gray' is not the same as 'Gray66' ; and 'Light Gray' is not the same as 'Gray83' .

These shades are not included in W3C specifications, although drafts for level 4 of the CSS Color module include a similar function gray(). They are still coded without 'Grey' alternatives, but with no space before the digit.

=== Numbered variants ===
For 78 colors (not counting grays), rgb.txt offers four variants "color1", "color2", "color3", and "color4", with "color1" sometimes corresponding to "color", so e.g. "Snow1" is the same as "Snow". Unlike base colors, e.g. cadet blue and CadetBlue, these are only coded without spaces, e.g. CadetBlue3. These variations are neither supported by popular browsers nor adopted by W3C standards. Whether or not a certain color has such variants seems random.

If "color1" is not the same as "color", the base color is usually darker. That means its brightness in HSB color notation is less than 100%; about 30 of the base colors are fully bright. The four variants (1...4) have rounded brightness values of 100%, 93%, 80% and 55%, respectively. Their hue and saturation are usually the same except for rounding. In some cases they differ from the base color, though, which may indicate that these variants were specified with alternate definitions of the bases in mind, i.e. their values were adapted to a certain monitor which was commonly done by vendors until the 1990s.

The fixed brightness settings correspond closely to these formulae to determine the RGB values:

color1 := color × 100%

color2 := color1 × 93.2%

color3 := color1 × 80.4%

color4 := color1 × 54.8%

Examples:

- "Yellow 2" (238, 238, 0) is based on "Yellow" (255, 255, 0) with 255 × 0.932 = 237.66.
- "Ivory 3" (205, 205, 193) is explained by "Ivory" (255, 255, 240) where 255 × 0.804 = 205.02 and 240 × 0.804 = 192.96.
- "Azure 4" (131, 139, 139) is close to "Azure" (240, 255, 255) values transformed as 255 × 0.548 = 139.74 and 240 × 0.548 = 131.52.

Named X11 colors with numbered variants (without grays)
Name	Hue	Saturation	Brightness	Standard	Variant 1 (100%)	Variant 2 (93.2%)	Variant 3 (80.4%)	Variant 4 (54.8%)
Antique White	34±1°	14%	98%	#FAEBD7	#FFEFDB	#EEDFCC	#CDC0B0	#8B8378
Aquamarine	160°	50%	100%	#7FFFD4	←	#76EEC6	#66CDAA	#458B74
Azure	180°	6%	100%	#F0FFFF	←	#E0EEEE	#C1CDCD	#838B8B
Bisque	33±1°	23%	100%	#FFE4C4	←	#EED5B7	#CDB79E	#8B7D6B
Blue	240°	100%	100%	#0000FF	←	#0000EE	#0000CD	#00008B
Brown	0°	75%	65%	#A52A2A	#FF4040	#EE3B3B	#CD3333	#8B2323
Burlywood	34°	39%	87%	#DEB887	#FFD39B	#EEC591	#CDAA7D	#8B7355
Cadet Blue	182–186°	>40%	63%	#5F9EA0	#98F5FF	#8EE5EE	#7AC5CD	#53868B
Chartreuse	90°	100%	100%	#7FFF00	←	#76EE00	#66CD00	#458B00
Chocolate	25°	86%	82%	#D2691E	#FF7F24	#EE7621	#CD661D	#8B4513
Coral	10°/16°	66%/69%	100%	#FF7F50	#FF7256	#EE6A50	#CD5B45	#8B3E2F
Cornsilk	48–51°	14%	100%	#FFF8DC	←	#EEE8CD	#CDC8B1	#8B8878
Cyan	180°	100%	100%	#00FFFF	←	#00EEEE	#00CDCD	#008B8B
Dark Goldenrod	43°	94%	72%	#B8860B	#FFB90F	#EEAD0E	#CD950C	#8B6508
Dark Olive Green	82°	56%	42%	#556B2F	#CAFF70	#BCEE68	#A2CD5A	#6E8B3D
Dark Orange	30°/33°	100%	100%	#FF8C00	#FF7F00	#EE7600	#CD6600	#8B4500
Dark Orchid	280°	76%	80%	#9932CC	#BF3EFF	#B23AEE	#9A32CD	#68228B
Dark Sea Green	120°	24%	74%	#8FBC8F	#C1FFC1	#B4EEB4	#9BCD9B	#698B69
Dark Slate Gray	180°	41%	31%	#2F4F4F	#97FFFF	#8DEEEE	#79CDCD	#528B8B
Deep Pink	328°	92%	100%	#FF1493	←	#EE1289	#CD1076	#8B0A50
Deep Sky Blue	195°	100%	100%	#00BFFF	←	#00B2EE	#009ACD	#00688B
Dodger Blue	210°	88%	100%	#1E90FF	←	#1C86EE	#1874CD	#104E8B
Firebrick	0°	81%	70%	#B22222	#FF3030	#EE2C2C	#CD2626	#8B1A1A
Gold	51°	100%	100%	#FFD700	←	#EEC900	#CDAD00	#8B7500
Goldenrod	43°	86%	86%	#DAA520	#FFC125	#EEB422	#CD9B1D	#8B6914
Green	120°	100%	100%	#00FF00	←	#00EE00	#00CD00	#008B00
Honeydew	120°	6%	100%	#F0FFF0	←	#E0EEE0	#C1CDC1	#838B83
Hot Pink	330–334°	53–59%	100%	#FF69B4	#FF6EB4	#EE6AA7	#CD6090	#8B3A62
Indian Red	0°	55–59%	80%	#CD5C5C	#FF6A6A	#EE6363	#CD5555	#8B3A3A
Ivory	60°	6%	100%	#FFFFF0	←	#EEEEE0	#CDCDC1	#8B8B83
Khaki	55°	44%	100%	#F0E68C	#FFF68F	#EEE685	#CDC673	#8B864E
Lavender Blush	339±1°	6%	100%	#FFF0F5	←	#EEE0E5	#CDC1C5	#8B8386
Lemon Chiffon	54°	20%	100%	#FFFACD	←	#EEE9BF	#CDC9A5	#8B8970
Light Blue	195°	25%	90%	#ADD8E6	#BFEFFF	#B2DFEE	#9AC0CD	#68838B
Light Cyan	180°	12%	100%	#E0FFFF	←	#D1EEEE	#B4CDCD	#7A8B8B
Light Goldenrod	50°	45%	93%	#EEDD82	#FFEC8B	#EEDC82	#CDBE70	#8B814C
Light Pink	351°/352°	29%/32%	100%	#FFB6C1	#FFAEB9	#EEA2AD	#CD8C95	#8B5F65
Light Salmon	17°	52%	100%	#FFA07A	←	#EE9572	#CD8162	#8B5742
Light Sky Blue	202°/203°	31%/46%	100%	#87CEFA	#B0E2FF	#A4D3EE	#8DB6CD	#607B8B
Light Steel Blue	214°	21%	87%	#B0C4DE	#CAE1FF	#BCD2EE	#A2B5CD	#6E7B8B
Light Yellow	60°	12%	100%	#FFFFE0	←	#EEEED1	#CDCDB4	#8B8B7A
Magenta	300°	100%	100%	#FF00FF	←	#EE00EE	#CD00CD	#8B008B
Maroon	322°/338°	73%/80%	69%	#B03060	#FF34B3	#EE30A7	#CD2990	#8B1C62
Medium Orchid	288°	60%	83%	#BA55D3	#E066FF	#D15FEE	#B452CD	#7A378B
Medium Purple	260°	49%	86%	#9370DB	#AB82FF	#9F79EE	#8968CD	#5D478B
Misty Rose	6°	12%	100%	#FFE4E1	←	#EED5D2	#CDB7B5	#8B7D7B
Navajo White	36°	32%	100%	#FFDEAD	←	#EECFA1	#CDB38B	#8B795E
Olive Drab	80°	76%	56%	#6B8E23	#C0FF3E	#B3EE3A	#9ACD32	#698B22
Orange	39°	100%	100%	#FFA500	←	#EE9A00	#CD8500	#8B5A00
Orange Red	16°	100%	100%	#FF4500	←	#EE4000	#CD3700	#8B2500
Orchid	302°	49%	86%	#DA70D6	#FF83FA	#EE7AE9	#CD69C9	#8B4789
Pale Green	120°	40%	98%	#98FB98	#9AFF9A	#90EE90	#7CCD7C	#548B54
Pale Turquoise	180°	27%	93%	#AFEEEE	#BBFFFF	#AEEEEE	#96CDCD	#668B8B
Pale Violet Red	340°	49%	86%	#DB7093	#FF82AB	#EE799F	#CD6889	#8B475D
Peach Puff	28°	27%	100%	#FFDAB9	←	#EECBAD	#CDAF95	#8B7765
Pink	347°/350°	25%/29%	100%	#FFC0CB	#FFB5C5	#EEA9B8	#CD919E	#8B636C
Plum	300°	27%	87%	#DDA0DD	#FFBBFF	#EEAEEE	#CD96CD	#8B668B
Purple	271°/277°	81%/87%	94%	#A020F0	#9B30FF	#912CEE	#7D26CD	#551A8B
Red	0°	100%	100%	#FF0000	←	#EE0000	#CD0000	#8B0000
Rosy Brown	0°	24%	74%	#BC8F8F	#FFC1C1	#EEB4B4	#CD9B9B	#8B6969
Royal Blue	225°	72%	88%	#4169E1	#4876FF	#436EEE	#3A5FCD	#27408B
Salmon	6°/14°	54%/59%	98%	#FA8072	#FF8C69	#EE8262	#CD7054	#8B4C39
Sea Green	147°	67%	55%	#2E8B57	#54FF9F	#4EEE94	#43CD80	#2E8B57
Seashell	26±1°	7%	100%	#FFF5EE	←	#EEE5DE	#CDC5BF	#8B8682
Sienna	19°	72%	63%	#A0522D	#FF8247	#EE7942	#CD6839	#8B4726
Sky Blue	197°/205°	43%/47%	92%	#87CEEB	#87CEFF	#7EC0EE	#6CA6CD	#4A708B
Slate Blue	248°	57%	80%	#6A5ACD	#836FFF	#7A67EE	#6959CD	#473C8B
Slate Gray	210°	22%	57%	#708090	#C6E2FF	#B9D3EE	#9FB6CD	#6C7B8B
Snow	0°	2%	100%	#FFFAFA	←	#EEE9E9	#CDC9C9	#8B8989
Spring Green	150°	100%	100%	#00FF7F	←	#00EE76	#00CD66	#008B45
Steel Blue	207°	61%	71%	#4682B4	#63B8FF	#5CACEE	#4F94CD	#36648B
Tan	30°/34°	33%/69%	82%	#D2B48C	#FFA54F	#EE9A49	#CD853F	#8B5A2B
Thistle	300°	12%	85%	#D8BFD8	#FFE1FF	#EED2EE	#CDB5CD	#8B7B8B
Tomato	9°	72%	100%	#FF6347	←	#EE5C42	#CD4F39	#8B3626
Turquoise	174°/182°	71%/100%	88%	#40E0D0	#00F5FF	#00E5EE	#00C5CD	#00868B
Violet Red	322°/333°	76%/85%	82%	#D02090	#FF3E96	#EE3A8C	#CD3278	#8B2252
Wheat	39°	27%	96%	#F5DEB3	#FFE7BA	#EED8AE	#CDBA96	#8B7E66
Yellow	60°	100%	100%	#FFFF00	←	#EEEE00	#CDCD00	#8B8B00

=== Prefixed variants ===
Some color names appear to be brightness or saturation modifications of others because they bear prefixes such as Dark, Light, Medium, Pale or Deep, but there is no systematic variation apparent. Several sets, however, feature a Dark variant with 55% brightness and some have their Medium at about 80%.

"Light Goldenrod Yellow" and "Dark Olive Green" are special, because there are no corresponding color entries without Dark and Light prefixes.

Color names with modifier prefix
Color name	Base	Pale	Light	Medium	Dark	Deep	other
Aquamarine	100% bright			80% bright			
Blue	100% bright		complex	80% bright	55% bright		
Slate Blue	80% bright		100% bright	93% bright	55% bright		
Sky Blue			complex			100% saturated and bright	
Steel Blue			complex				
Coral			complex				
Cyan	100% bright, 50% light		94% light		55% bright		
Goldenrod		complex	complex		complex		complex
Gray	75% bright		83% bright		66% bright		41% bright
Slate Gray	57% bright		60% bright		complex		
Green	100% bright	98% bright	93% bright		39% bright		50% bright
Olive Green	—				complex		complex
Sea Green	55% bright		complex	70% bright	complex		
Spring Green	100% bright			complex			
Khaki	94% bright				74% bright		
Magenta	100% bright				55% bright		
Orange	39° hue				33° hue		
Orchid				complex	complex		
Pink	88% light		86% light			complex	complex
Purple				complex			complex
Violet Red	47% light, 82% bright	complex		43% light, 78% bright			
Red	100% bright				55% bright		
Salmon			complex		complex		
Turquoise		complex		complex	complex		
Violet					complex		
Yellow	50% light		94% light				

=== Nuances with different hue ===
Several groups of colors share the same lightness or brightness and saturation. These nuances differ only by hue.

100%/25%
0° (Web) Maroon, 60° Olive, 120° Green, 180° Teal, 240° Navy (Blue), 300° (Web) Purple
100%/27%
0° Dark Red, 180° Dark Cyan, 240° Dark Blue, 300° Dark Magenta
100%/41%
181° Dark Turquoise, 282° Dark Violet
100%/49%
90° Lawn Green, 157° Medium Spring Green
61%/50%
80° Yellow Green, 120° Lime Green, 280° Dark Orchid
100%/50%
0° Red, 16° Orange Red, 33° Dark Orange, 39° Orange, 51° Gold, 60° Yellow, 90° Chartreuse, 120° (Lime) Green, 150° Spring Green, 180° Aqua / Cyan, 195° Deep Sky Blue, 240° Blue, 300° Fuchsia / Magenta
25%/65%
0° Rosy Brown, 120° Dark Sea Green
59–60%/65%
260° Medium Purple, 302° Orchid, 340° Pale Violet Red
100%/86%
38° Moccasin, 351° Light Pink
100%/90%
36° Blanched Almond, 54° Lemon Chiffon
67%/94%
30° Linen, 240° Lavender
100%/94%
6° Misty Rose, 60° Light Yellow, 180° Light Cyan
100%/97%
25° Seashell, 40° Floral White, 60° Ivory, 120° Honeydew, 180° Azure, 208° Alice Blue, 340° Lavender Blush
100%/99%
0° Snow, 240° Ghost White

=== Tints and shades with different lightness ===
Several groups of colors share the same hue and HSL saturation. Tints are lighter than a base color, shades are darker.

0°/0%
0% Black, 41% Dim Gray, 50% (Web) Gray, 66% Dark Gray, 75% (X11) Gray, 75% Silver, 83% Light Gray, 86% Gainsboro, 96% White Smoke, 100% White
0°/100%
25% (Web) Maroon, 27% Dark Red, 50% Red, 99% Snow
16°/100%
50% Orange Red, 66% Coral
33°/100%
50% Dark Orange, 88% Bisque
36°/100%
84% Navajo White, 90% Blanched Almond
60°/100%
25% Olive, 50% Yellow, 94% Light Yellow, 97% Ivory
80°/61%
35% Olive Drab, 50% Yellow Green
90°/100%
49% Lawn Green, 50% Chartreuse
120°/61%
34% Forest Green, 50% Lime Green
120°/100%
20% Dark Green, 25% (Web) Green, 50% (X11) Green / Lime, 97% Honeydew
146–147°/50%
36% Sea Green, 47% Medium Sea Green
150°/100%
50% Spring Green, 98% Mint Cream
180–181°/100%
25% Teal, 27% Dark Cyan, 41% Dark Turquoise, 50% Aqua / Cyan, 94% Light Cyan, 97% Azure
240°/100%
25% Navy Blue, 27% Dark Blue, 40% Medium Blue, 50% Blue, 99% Ghost White
300°/100%
25% (Web) Purple, 27% Dark Magenta, 50% Fuchsia / Magenta
328–330°/100%
54% Deep Pink, 71% Hot Pink
350–351°/100%
88% Pink, 86% Light Pink

=== Tones with different saturation ===
Some pairs of colors share the same lightness and hue. These tones differ only by saturation. Tones are far less common in the X11 set than nuances, tints and shades.

0°/41%
0% Dim Gray, 59% Brown
120°/50%
61% Lime Green, 100% Green / Lime
180°/25%
25% Dark Slate Gray, 100% Teal
240°/27%
64% Midnight Blue, 100% Dark Blue

== Derived lists ==
The Printer Working Group (PWG) of the IEEE publishes a standard, PWG 5101.1, whose mandatory color names are based upon RFC 3805, successor to RFC 1759 which imported the functional color names other, unknown and transparent alongside seven basic colors from ISO 10175 (DPA) and ISO 10180 (SPDL), and JTAPI. This standard has four variants for each non-monochromatic color: clear (50% transparent), dark, light and the default. Wherever possible, the values are the same as in the W3C adaptation of the X11 list, except for Turquoise which is instead of . Missing variant values have been added systematically. Buff and Mustard are completely new color names. Light Black and Gray correspond to the same color.

PWG 5101.1 Media Color Names
Name	Hex (RGB)	Red (RGB)	Green (RGB)	Blue (RGB)	Hue (HSL/HSV)	Satur. (HSL)	Light (HSL)	Satur. (HSV)	Value (HSV)	X11/W3C (Source)
Black	#000000	0%	0%	0%	0°	0%	0%	0%	0%	Black
Light Black	#808080	50%	50%	50%	0°	0%	50%	0%	50%	Gray
Blue	#0000FF	0%	0%	100%	240°	100%	50%	100%	100%	Blue (RFC)
Dark Blue	#00008B	0%	0%	55%	240°	100%	27%	100%	55%	Dark Blue
Light Blue	#ADD8E6	68%	85%	90%	195°	53%	79%	25%	90%	Light Blue
Brown	#A52A2A	65%	16%	16%	0°	59%	41%	75%	65%	Brown
Dark Brown	#5C4033	36%	25%	20%	19°	29%	28%	45%	36%	
Light Brown	#996600	60%	40%	0%	40°	100%	30%	100%	60%	
Buff	#F0DC82	94%	86%	51%	49°	79%	73%	46%	94%	(RFC)
Dark Buff	#976638	59%	40%	22%	29°	46%	41%	63%	59%	
Light Buff	#ECD9B0	93%	85%	69%	41°	61%	81%	25%	93%	
Cyan	#00FFFF	0%	100%	100%	180°	100%	50%	100%	100%	Aqua / Cyan
Dark Cyan	#008B8B	0%	55%	55%	180°	100%	27%	100%	55%	Dark Cyan
Light Cyan	#E0FFFF	88%	100%	100%	180°	100%	94%	12%	100%	Light Cyan
Gold	#FFD700	100%	84%	0%	51°	100%	50%	100%	100%	Gold
Dark Gold	#EEBC1D	93%	74%	11%	46°	86%	52%	88%	93%	
Light Gold	#F1E5AC	95%	90%	67%	50°	71%	81%	29%	95%	
Goldenrod	#DAA520	85%	65%	13%	43°	74%	49%	85%	86%	Goldenrod (RFC)
Dark Goldenrod	#B8860B	72%	53%	4%	43°	89%	38%	94%	72%	Dark Goldenrod
Light Goldenrod	#FFEC8B	100%	93%	55%	50°	100%	77%	46%	100%	Light Goldenrod 1
Gray	#808080	50%	50%	50%	0°	0%	50%	0%	50%	Gray
Dark Gray	#404040	25%	25%	25%	0°	0%	25%	0%	25%	
Light Gray	#D3D3D3	83%	83%	83%	0°	0%	83%	0%	83%	Light Gray
Green	#008000	0%	50%	0%	120°	100%	25%	100%	50%	(W3C) Green (RFC)
Dark Green	#006400	0%	39%	0%	120°	100%	20%	100%	39%	Dark Green
Light Green	#90EE90	56%	93%	56%	120°	73%	75%	40%	93%	Light Green
Ivory	#FFFFF0	100%	100%	94%	60°	100%	97%	6%	100%	Ivory
Dark Ivory	#F2E58F	95%	90%	56%	52°	79%	76%	41%	95%	
Light Ivory	#FFF8C9	100%	97%	79%	52°	100%	89%	21%	100%	
Magenta	#FF00FF	100%	0%	100%	300°	100%	50%	100%	100%	Magenta
Dark Magenta	#8B008B	55%	0%	55%	300°	100%	27%	100%	55%	Dark Magenta, Magenta 4
Light Magenta	#FF77FF	100%	47%	100%	300°	100%	73%	53%	100%	
Mustard	#FFDB58	100%	86%	35%	47°	100%	67%	66%	100%	
Dark Mustard	#7C7C40	49%	49%	25%	60°	32%	37%	48%	49%	
Light Mustard	#EEDD62	93%	87%	38%	53°	81%	66%	59%	93%	
Orange	#FFA500	100%	65%	0%	39°	100%	50%	100%	100%	Orange
Dark Orange	#FF8C00	100%	55%	0%	33°	100%	50%	100%	100%	Dark Orange
Light Orange	#D9A465	85%	64%	40%	33°	60%	62%	54%	85%	
Pink	#FFC0CB	100%	75%	80%	350°	100%	88%	25%	100%	Pink (RFC)
Dark Pink	#E75480	91%	33%	50%	342°	75%	62%	64%	91%	
Light Pink	#FFB6C1	100%	71%	76%	351°	100%	86%	29%	100%	Light Pink
Red	#FF0000	100%	0%	0%	0°	100%	50%	100%	100%	Red
Dark Red	#8B0000	55%	0%	0%	0°	100%	27%	100%	55%	Dark Red, Red 4
Light Red	#FF3333	100%	20%	20%	0°	100%	60%	80%	100%	
Silver	#C0C0C0	75%	75%	75%	0°	0%	75%	0%	75%	Silver
Dark Silver	#AFAFAF	69%	69%	69%	0°	0%	69%	0%	69%	
Light Silver	#E1E1E1	88%	88%	88%	0°	0%	88%	0%	88%	
Turquoise	#30D5C8	19%	84%	78%	175°	66%	51%	78%	84%	(0x40E0D0)
Dark Turquoise	#00CED1	0%	81%	82%	181°	100%	41%	100%	82%	Dark Turquoise
Light Turquoise	#AFE4DE	69%	89%	87%	173°	50%	79%	23%	89%	
Violet	#EE82EE	93%	51%	93%	300°	76%	72%	45%	93%	Violet
Dark Violet	#9400D3	58%	0%	83%	282°	100%	41%	100%	83%	Dark Violet
Light Violet	#7A5299	48%	32%	60%	274°	30%	46%	46%	60%	
White	#FFFFFF	100%	100%	100%	0°	0%	100%	0%	100%	White (RFC)
Yellow	#FFFF00	100%	100%	0%	60°	100%	50%	100%	100%	Yellow (RFC)
Dark Yellow	#FFCC00	100%	80%	0%	48°	100%	50%	100%	100%	
Light Yellow	#FFFFE0	100%	100%	88%	60°	100%	94%	12%	100%	Light Yellow

== See also ==
- List of colors
- Web colors § X11 color names
- XPM (image format)
