= Alice blue =

Pale tint of greyish blue, named for Alice Roosevelt

Alice Blue

Color coordinates
- Hex triplet: #F0F8FF
- sRGB^{B} (r, g, b): (240, 248, 255)
- HSV (h, s, v): (208°, 6%, 100%)
- CIELCh_{uv} (L, C, h): (97, 8, 233°)
- Source: X11
- ISCC–NBS descriptor: Greenish white
- B: Normalized to [0–255] (byte)

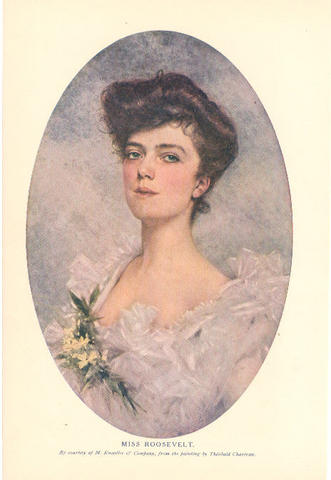
Portrait of Alice Roosevelt, made in 1901 by Théobald Chartran

Alice blue, also known as Alice Blue, is a pale tint of blue, that was famous for being a favorite color of Alice Roosevelt Longworth, daughter of Theodore Roosevelt. First used in 1905 and popular throughout the early 20th century, it was frequently shown in advertisements. It inspired the hit song "Alice Blue Gown".

It is the designated color for use in insignia and trim on the USS Theodore Roosevelt and is one of the original 1987 X11 color names which became the basis for color description in web authoring.

== Description of color ==
Most descriptions of the color agree that it is a pale blue with a greyish tinge. Merriam-Webster defines it as "a pale blue to grayish blue that is redder and stronger than forget-me-not".

But according to a 1933 article, at the time, "almost any blue that was not 'baby blue' or 'periwinkle' was 'Alice blue.'"

In 1987 "AliceBlue" was selected as one of the X11 color names and defined as #F0F8FF.

== History ==
Alice blue (web color)

Color coordinates
- Hex triplet: #F0F8FF
- sRGB^{B} (r, g, b): (240, 248, 255)
- HSV (h, s, v): (208°, 6%, 100%)
- CIELCh_{uv} (L, C, h): (97, 8, 233°)
- Source: X11
- ISCC–NBS descriptor: Greenish white
- B: Normalized to [0–255] (byte)

Introduced in 1905, the color gained widespread popularity in the early 20th century thanks to its reputation as the favorite color of Alice Roosevelt Longworth, daughter of Theodore Roosevelt, said to "[match] her steely eyes".

Frequently shown in advertisements throughout the continent, Alice blue was a popular color choice for fashionable textiles and attire. The color name was common enough to be used without glossing in professional journals.

== "Alice Blue Gown" ==
Release in 1919, the Broadway musical Irene was incredible popular running for 670 performances, setting a record which it held for 18 years. It "established the pattern of the 'Cinderella musical'" that dominated musical comedy in the 1920s". The hit song of the musical was "Alice Blue Gown" in which the heroine, played by Edith Day, sings about her beloved blue gown.

By 1928 burlesque performers began adapting Tin Pan Alley songs such as "Alice Blue Gown" into jazz- and blues-influenced routines with provocative elements. In these performances, the Alice blue gown often served as a literal costume element that could be removed as part of the act.

The song experienced a resurgence in the early 1940s through recordings by Frankie Masters, Ozzie Nelson, and Glenn Miller. In 1940, Hollywood released a film adaptation of Irene starring Anna Neagle and the musical was later revived on Broadway in 1973, featuring Debbie Reynolds in the lead role. Variety included "Alice Blue Gown" in its Hit Parade of a Half-Century as the representative song for 1919.

== Uses ==
The color is specified by the United States Navy for use in insignia and trim on the USS Theodore Roosevelt. "AliceBlue" is also one of the original 1987 X11 color names which became the basis for color description in web authoring.
