= Aquamarine (color) =

Blue-green color

Color coordinates
- Hex triplet: #7FFFD4
- sRGB^{B} (r, g, b): (127, 255, 212)
- HSV (h, s, v): (160°, 50%, 100%)
- CIELCh_{uv} (L, C, h): (92, 60, 158°)
- Source: X11
- ISCC–NBS descriptor: Brilliant green
- B: Normalized to [0–255] (byte)

Aquamarine (RGB)

Color coordinates
- Hex triplet: #00DFFF
- sRGB^{B} (r, g, b): (0, 223, 255)
- HSV (h, s, v): (188°, 100%, 100%)
- CIELCh_{uv} (L, C, h): (82, 72, 214°)
- B: Normalized to [0–255] (byte)

Medium aquamarine

Color coordinates
- Hex triplet: #66CDAA
- sRGB^{B} (r, g, b): (102, 205, 170)
- HSV (h, s, v): (160°, 50%, 80%)
- CIELCh_{uv} (L, C, h): (76, 49, 158°)
- Source: X11
- ISCC–NBS descriptor: Brilliant green
- B: Normalized to [0–255] (byte)

Aquamarine is a pale blue-green color between cyan and cerulean on the color wheel. It is named after the mineral aquamarine, a gemstone mainly found in granite rocks. The first recorded use of aquamarine as a color name in English was in 1598.

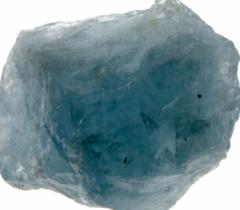
Rough aquamarine

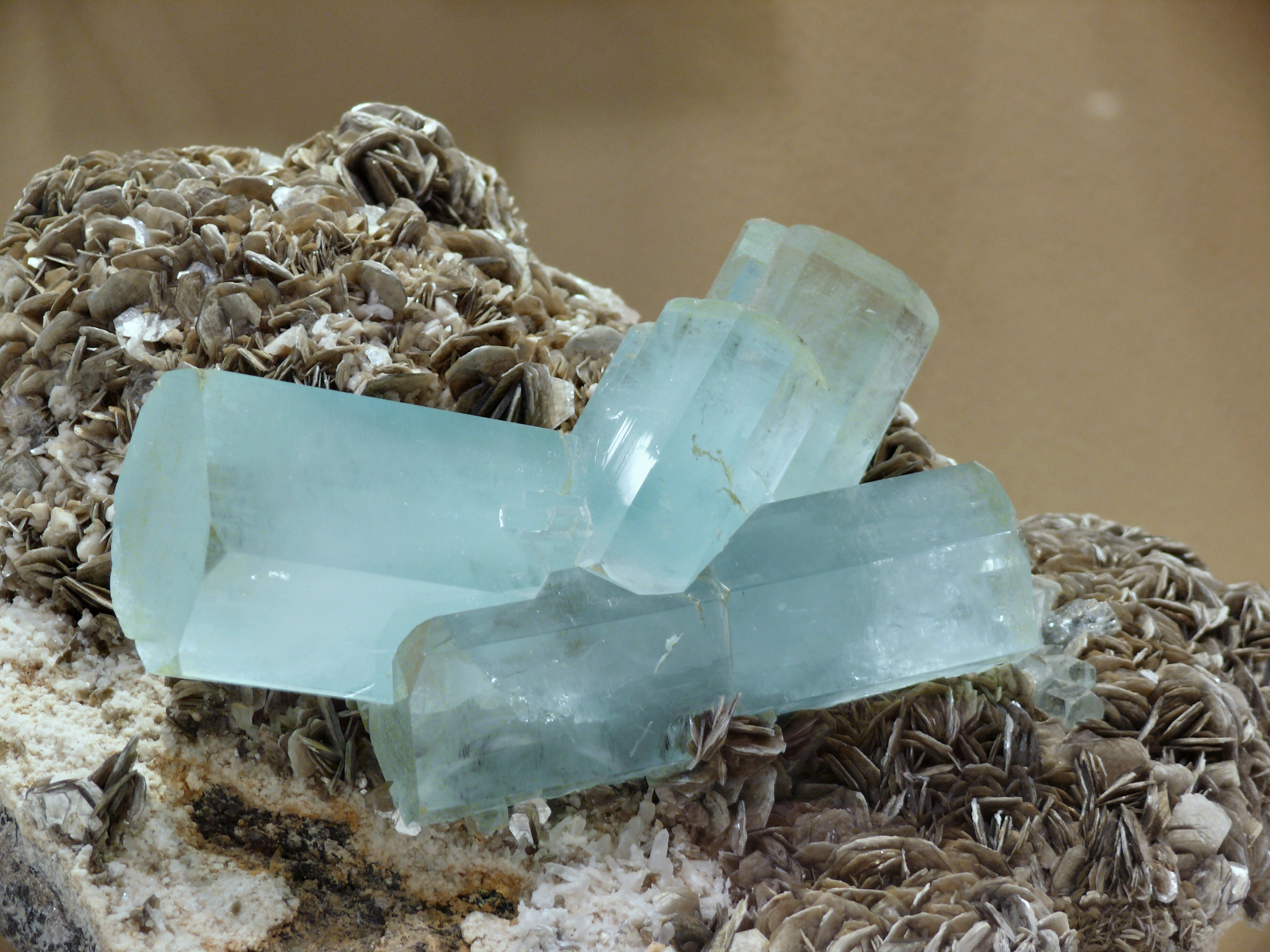
Aquamarine crystals on muscovite

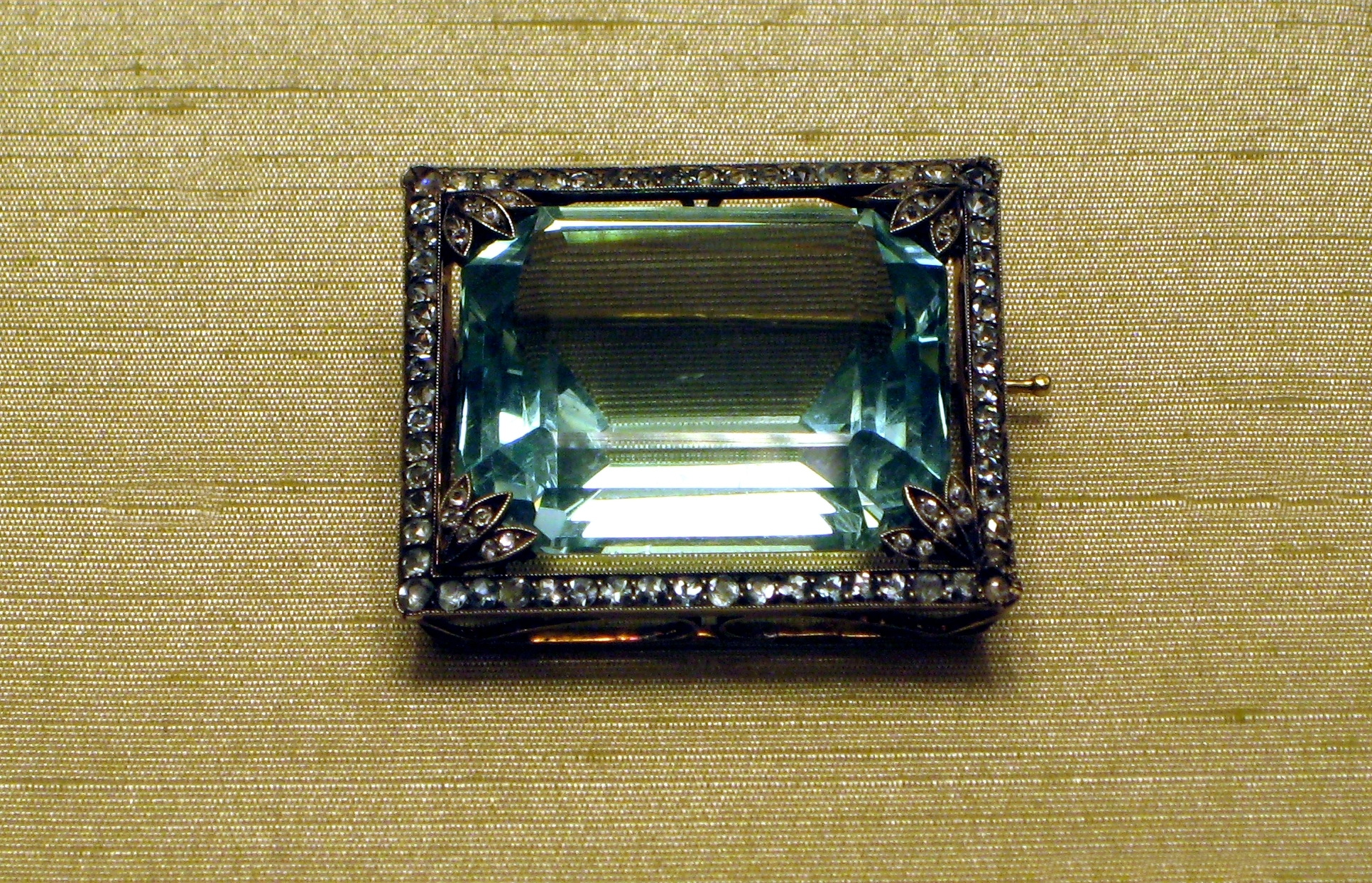
An aquamarine brooch

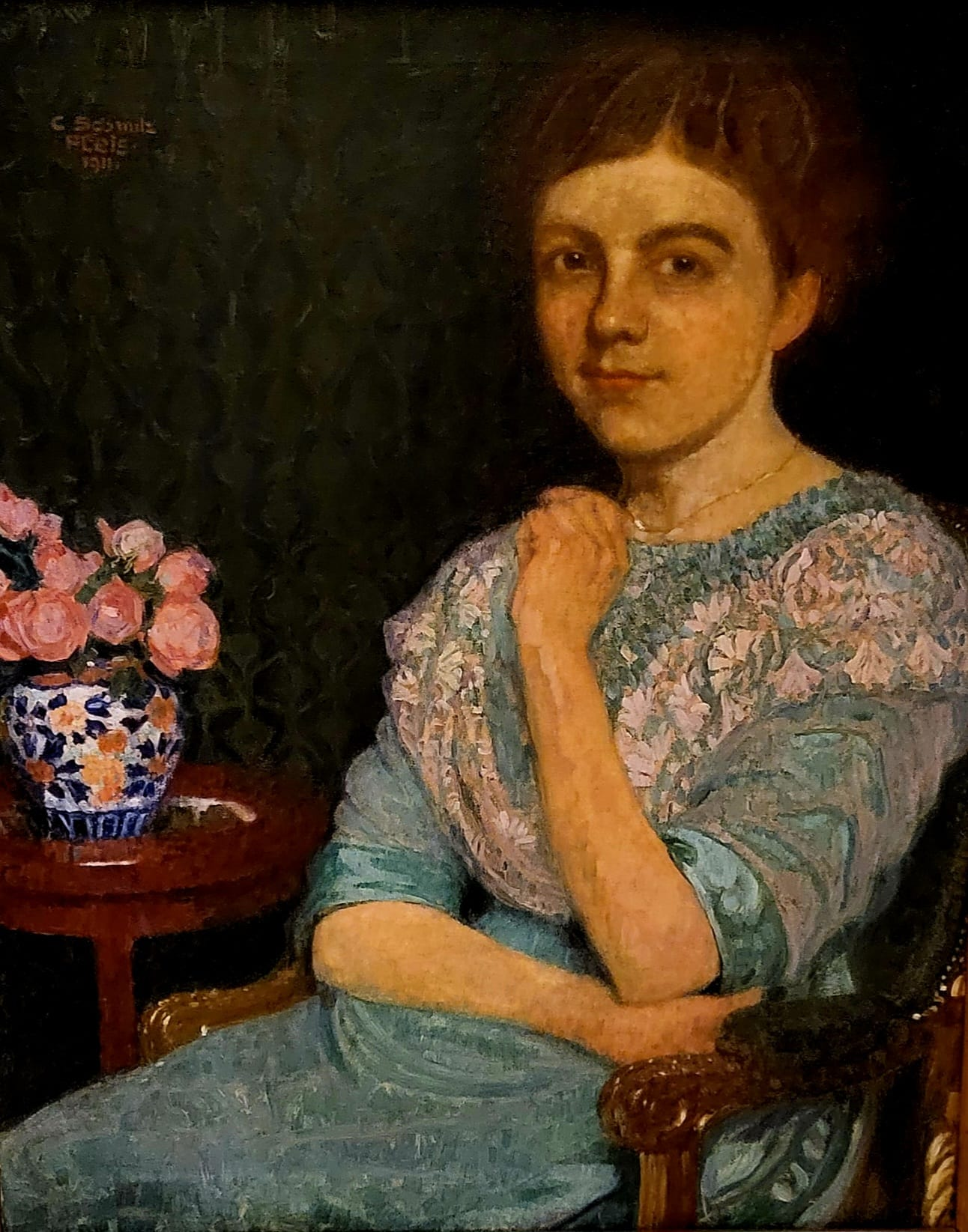
Lady in Aquamarine by Carl Schmitz-Pleis, 1911

== See also ==
- List of colors
