= Salmon (color) =

Warm color

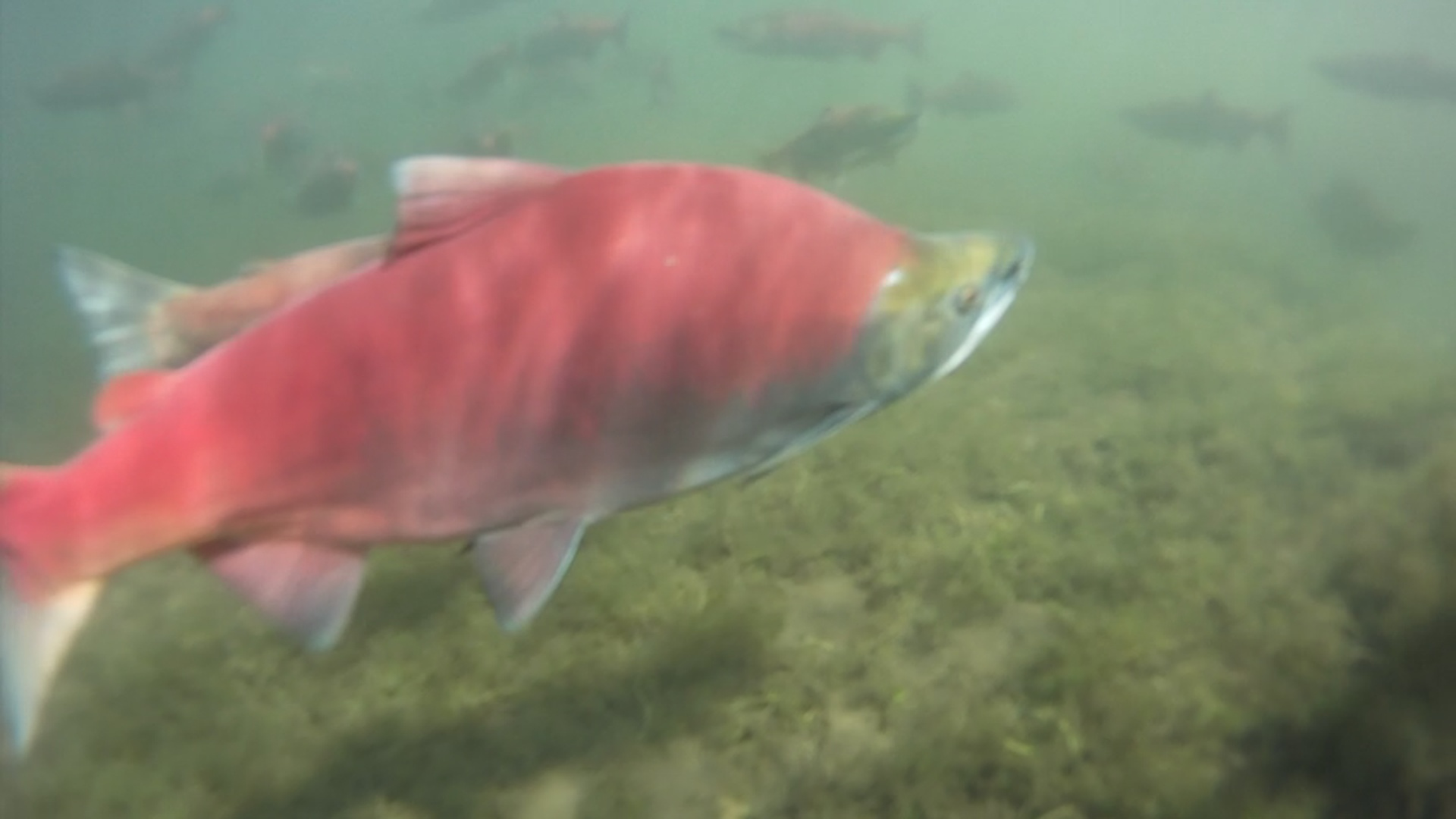
- Sockeye male salmon

Color coordinates
- Hex triplet: #FA8072
- sRGB^{B} (r, g, b): (250, 128, 114)
- HSV (h, s, v): (6°, 54%, 98%)
- CIELCh_{uv} (L, C, h): (67, 95, 17°)
- Source: X11
- ISCC–NBS descriptor: Strong reddish orange
- B: Normalized to [0–255] (byte)

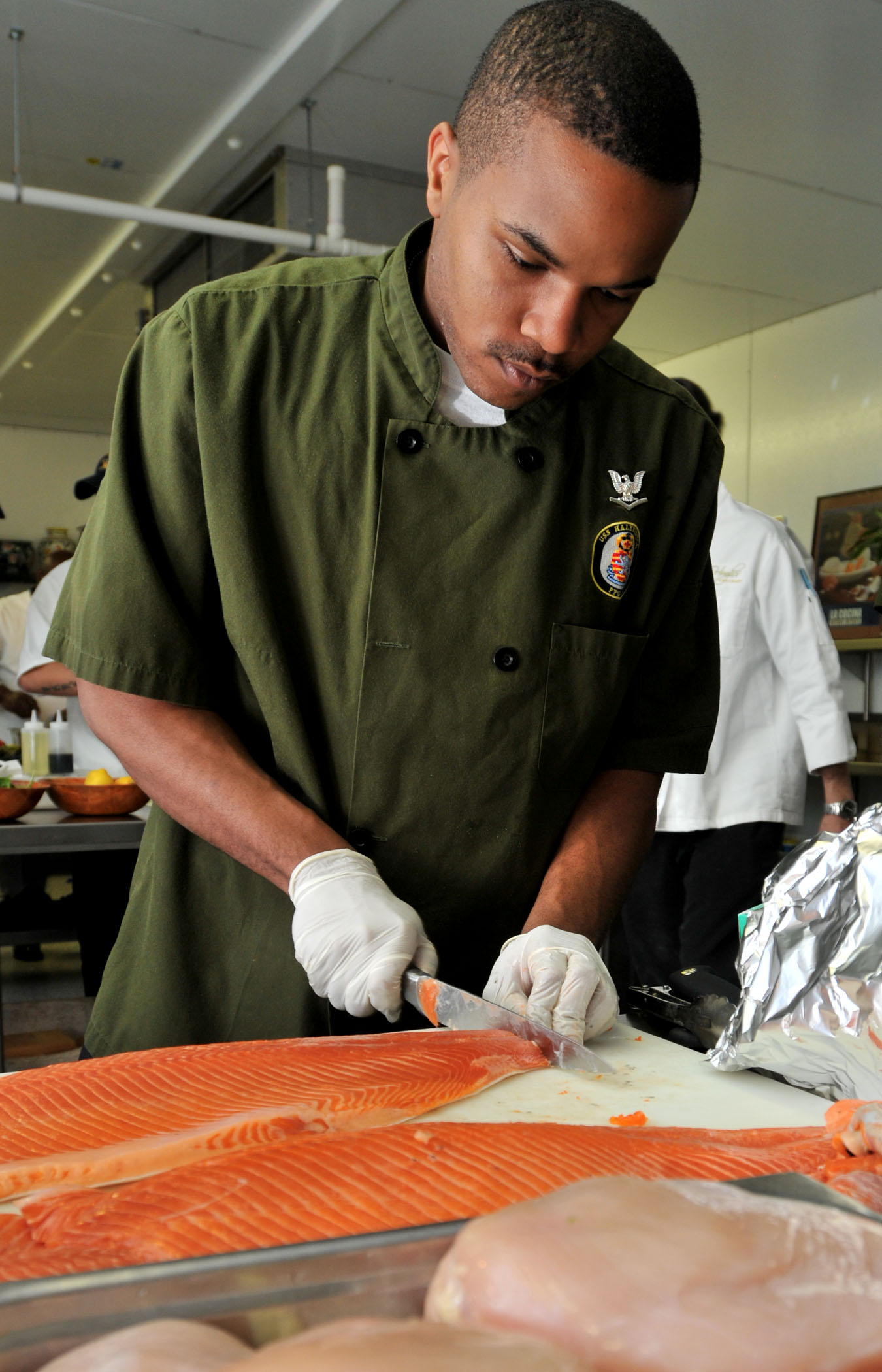
The flesh of the salmon fish is salmon-colored.

Salmon is a warm color ranging from light orange to pink, named after the color of salmon flesh.

The first recorded use of salmon as a color name in English was in 1776.

The actual color of salmon flesh varies from almost white to light orange, depending on their levels of the carotenoid astaxanthin, which in turn is the result of the richness of the fish's diet of krill and shrimp; salmon raised on fish farms are given non-synthetic or artificial coloring in their food.

The flesh of Atlantic salmon (Salmo salar) is lighter and oranger than that of the various Pacific salmon species (from the genus Oncorhynchus).

== Variations of salmon ==
Light salmon

Color coordinates
- Hex triplet: #FFA07A
- sRGB^{B} (r, g, b): (255, 160, 122)
- HSV (h, s, v): (17°, 52%, 100%)
- CIELCh_{uv} (L, C, h): (75, 80, 28°)
- Source: X11
- ISCC–NBS descriptor: Strong yellowish pink
- B: Normalized to [0–255] (byte)

Salmon pink

Color coordinates
- Hex triplet: #FF91A4
- sRGB^{B} (r, g, b): (255, 145, 164)
- HSV (h, s, v): (350°, 43%, 100%)
- CIELCh_{uv} (L, C, h): (72, 73, 3°)
- Source: Crayola
- ISCC–NBS descriptor: Strong pink
- B: Normalized to [0–255] (byte)

Dark salmon

Color coordinates
- Hex triplet: #E9967A
- sRGB^{B} (r, g, b): (233, 150, 122)
- HSV (h, s, v): (15°, 48%, 91%)
- CIELCh_{uv} (L, C, h): (70, 67, 27°)
- Source: X11
- ISCC–NBS descriptor: Strong yellowish pink
- B: Normalized to [0–255] (byte)

Terra cotta

Color coordinates
- Hex triplet: #E2725B
- sRGB^{B} (r, g, b): (226, 114, 91)
- HSV (h, s, v): (10°, 60%, 89%)
- CIELCh_{uv} (L, C, h): (61, 90, 20°)
- Source: DMC Color List
- ISCC–NBS descriptor: Strong reddish orange
- B: Normalized to [0–255] (byte)

Salmon pink (or salmon in Crayola crayons) was introduced by Crayola in 1949. See the List of Crayola crayon colors.

Light salmon has a yellower hue and less saturation when compared to salmon.

Dark salmon resembles the color light salmon, but is grayer. Like the web colors shown above, it is used in HTML and CSS.

Terra cotta is a tone with relatively low brightness. It resembles terracotta pottery.

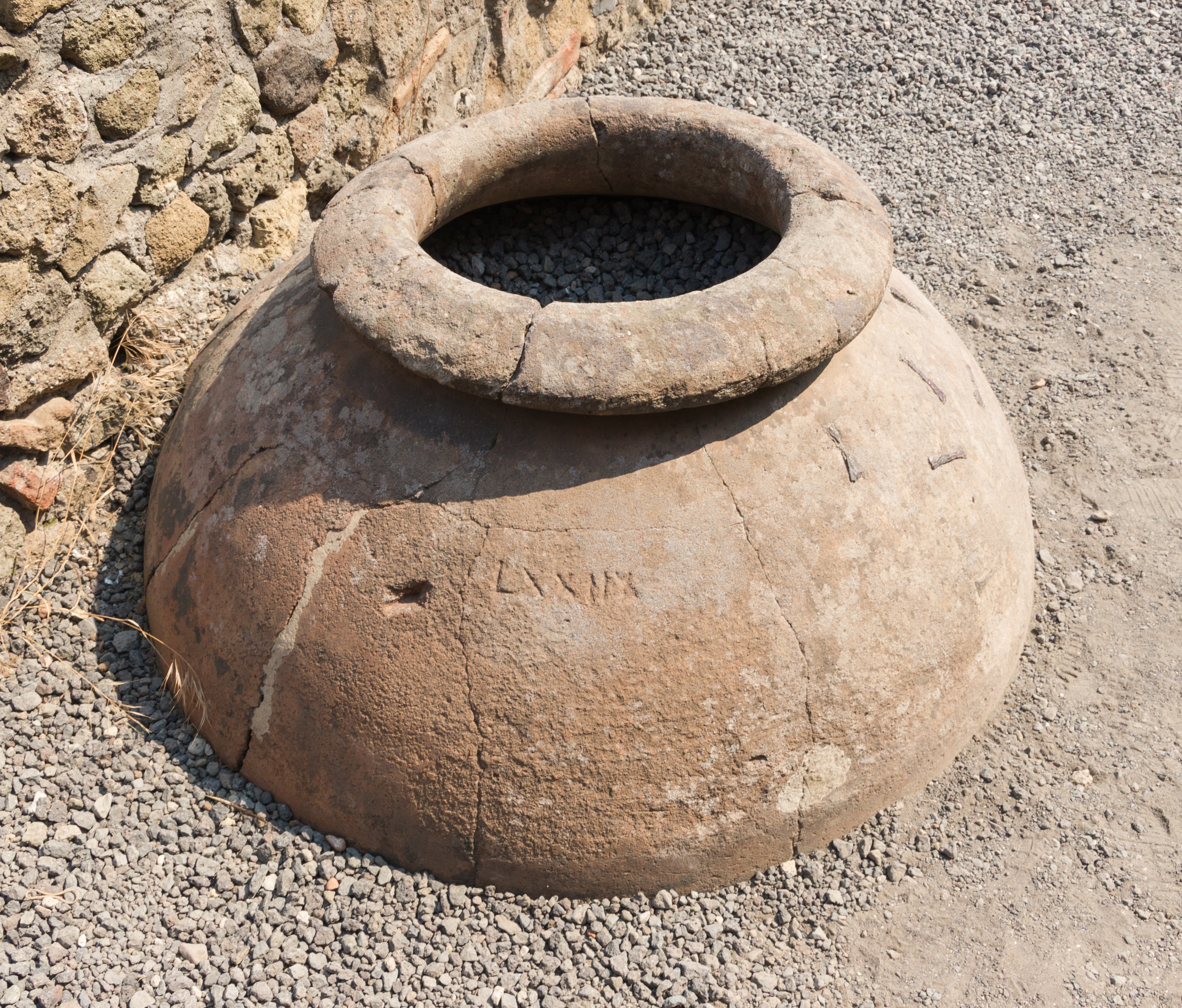
A terracotta jar

== See also ==
- List of colors
- Coral (color)
