= Seashell (color) =

Color

Color coordinates
- Hex triplet: #FFF5EE
- sRGB^{B} (r, g, b): (255, 245, 238)
- HSV (h, s, v): (25°, 7%, 100%)
- CIELCh_{uv} (L, C, h): (97, 9, 47°)
- Source: X11
- ISCC–NBS descriptor: Yellowish white
- B: Normalized to [0–255] (byte)

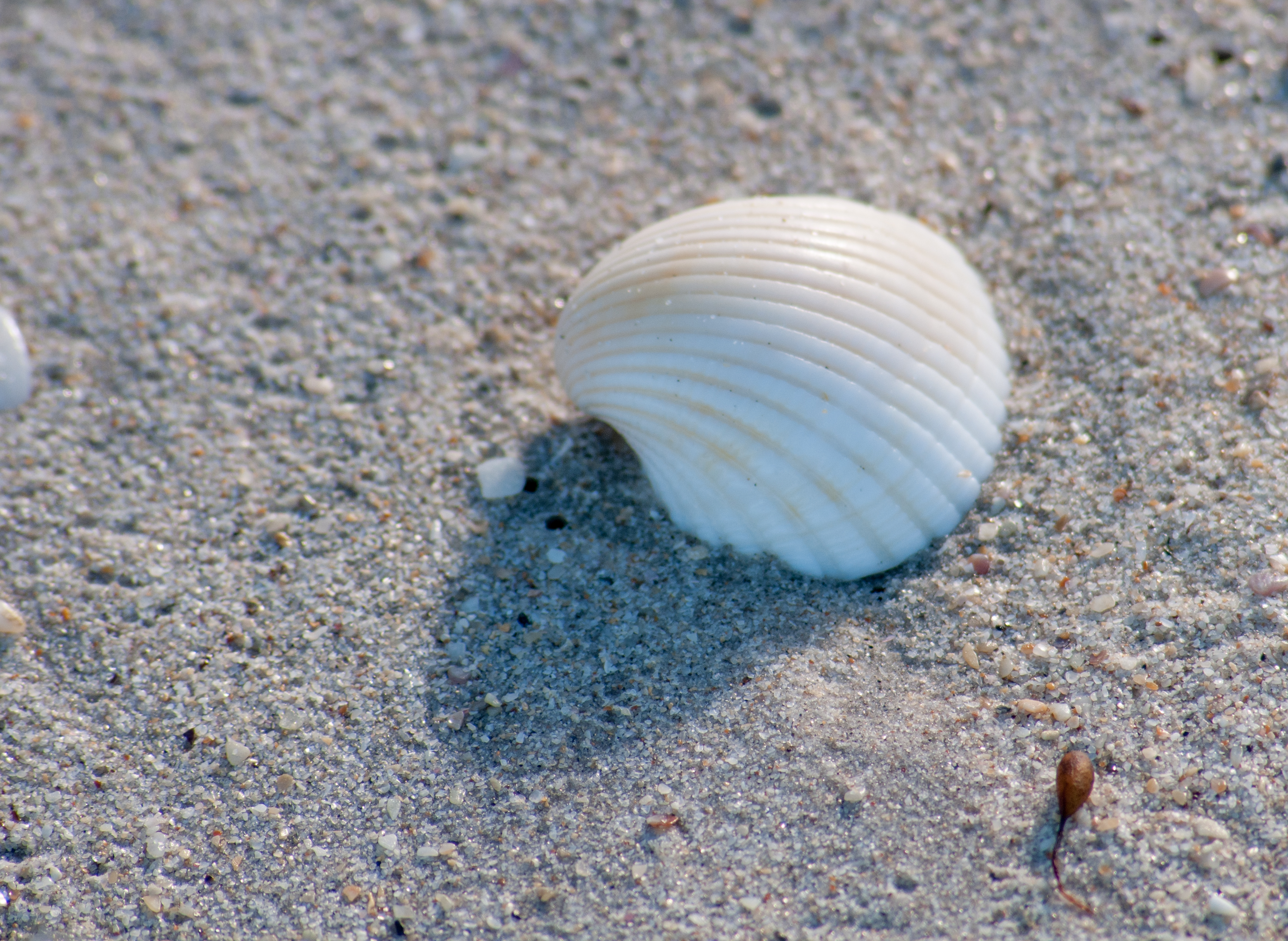
Seashell in the sand

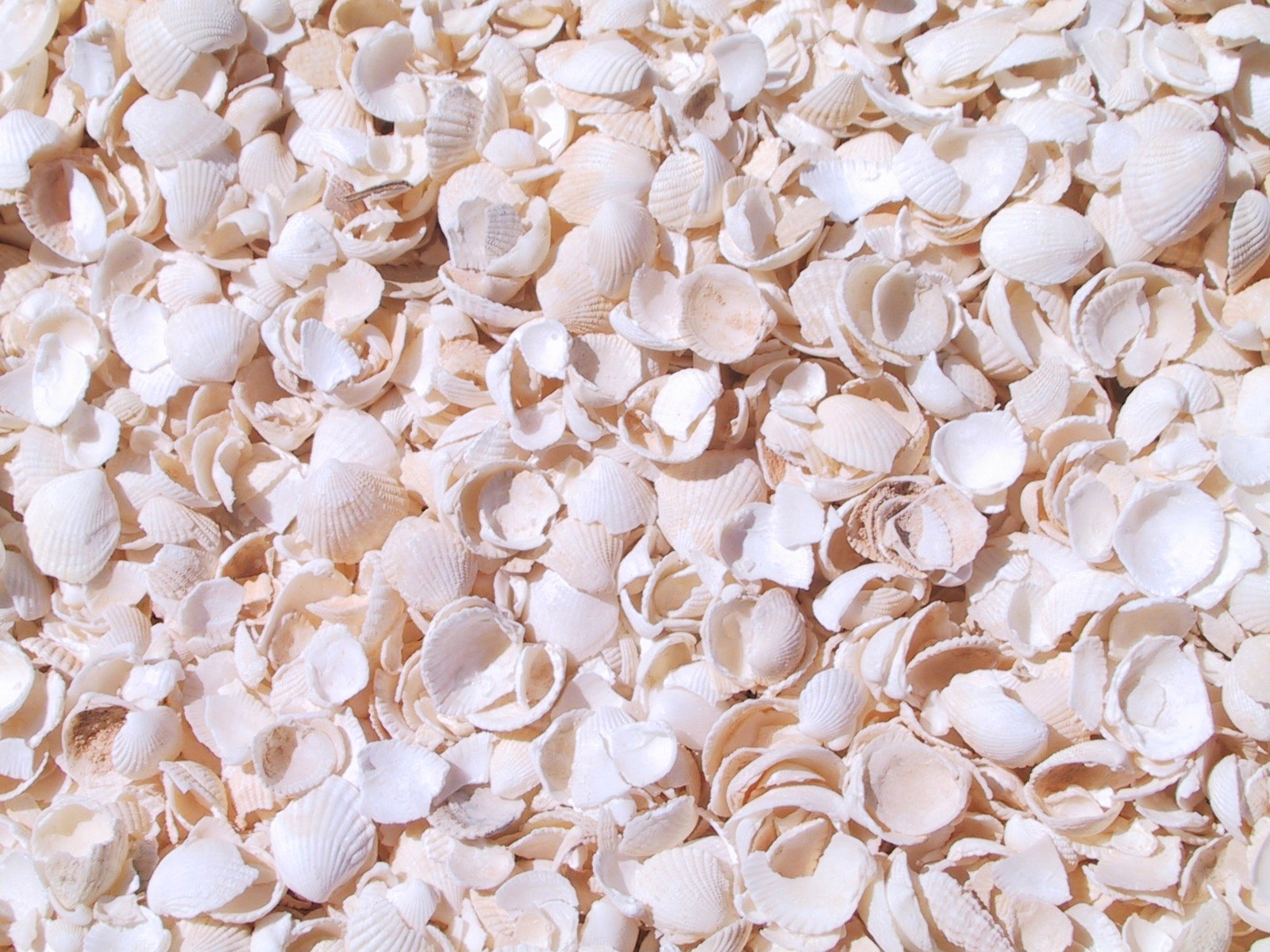
Cockle on the Shell Beach, Western Australia

Seashell is an off-white color that resembles some of the very pale pinkish tones that are common in many seashells.

The first recorded use of seashell as a color name in English was in 1926.

In 1987, "seashell" was included as one of the X11 colors.

== See also ==
- List of colors
