= Aqua (color) =

Variation of cyan

Color coordinates
- Hex triplet: #00FFFF
- sRGB^{B} (r, g, b): (0, 255, 255)
- HSV (h, s, v): (180°, 100%, 100%)
- CIELCh_{uv} (L, C, h): (91, 72, 192°)
- Source: HTML/CSS
- ISCC–NBS descriptor: Brilliant bluish green
- B: Normalized to [0–255] (byte)

Aqua (Latin for "water") is a variation of the color cyan. The normalized color coordinates for the two web colors named aqua and cyan are identical. It was one of the three secondary colors of the RGB color model used on computer and television displays. In the HSV color wheel aqua is precisely halfway between blue and green. However, aqua is not the same as the primary subtractive color named process cyan used in printing.

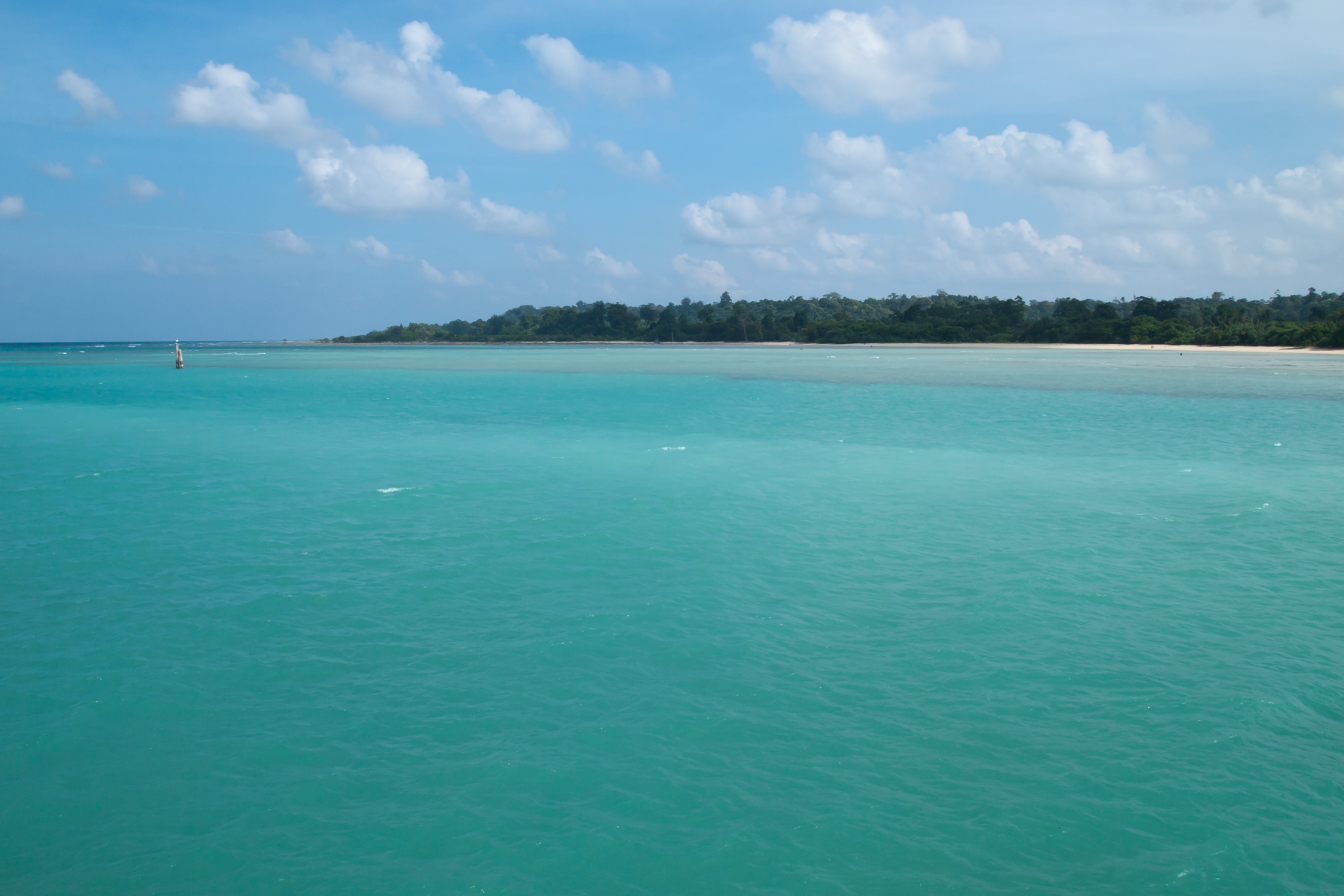
Aqua colored sea waters in the Andaman and Nicobar Islands

The words "aqua" and "cyan" are used interchangeably in computer graphics, and especially web design, to refer to the additive secondary color "cyan". Both colors are made exactly the same way on a computer screen, by combining blue and green light at equal and full intensity on a black screen. Traditionally, that color, defined as #00FFFF in hex, or (0,255,255) in RGB. The #00FFFF color code is called "cyan" in the RGB color but the X11 color names introduced the alternative name "aqua" for #00FFFF in 1987. Later, W3C popularized the name by using it in the named color palette of HTML 3.2 specifications.

== Pale aqua ==
Pale Aqua

Color coordinates
- Hex triplet: #BCD4E6
- sRGB^{B} (r, g, b): (188, 212, 230)
- HSV (h, s, v): (206°, 18%, 90%)
- CIELCh_{uv} (L, C, h): (84, 22, 232°)
- Source: ISCC-NBS
- ISCC–NBS descriptor: Very pale blue
- B: Normalized to [0–255] (byte)

Displayed in the right-hand column is the color pale aqua.

== See also ==
- Color of water
- Lists of colors
