= Goldenrod (color) =

Color of the goldenrod plant

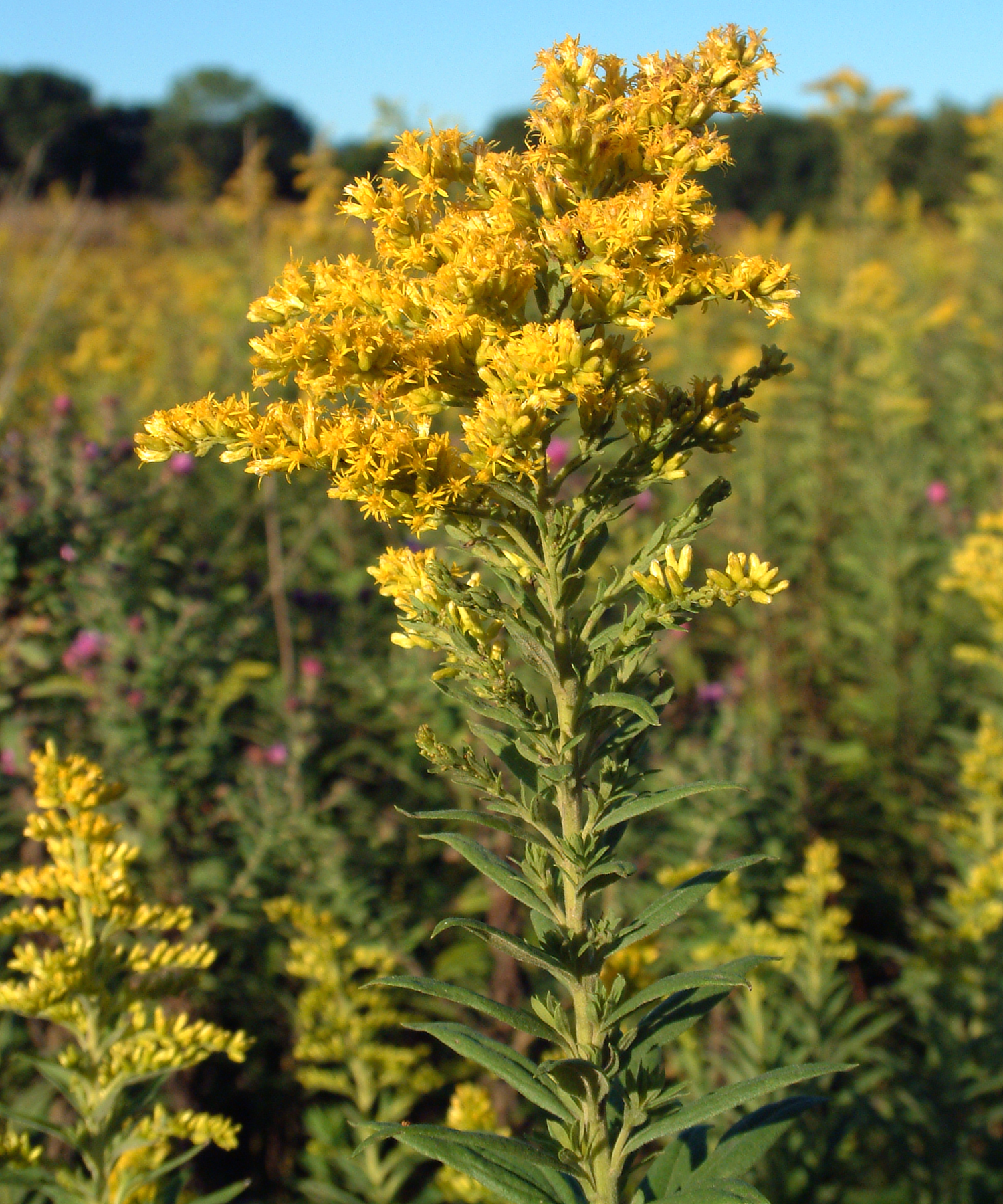
- Goldenrod plants

Color coordinates
- Hex triplet: #DAA520
- sRGB^{B} (r, g, b): (218, 165, 32)
- HSV (h, s, v): (43°, 85%, 85%)
- CIELCh_{uv} (L, C, h): (71, 83, 58°)
- Source: X11
- ISCC–NBS descriptor: Strong yellow
- B: Normalized to [0–255] (byte)

Goldenrod is a color that resembles that of the goldenrod plant.

A Crayola crayon with this name, although a lighter color, was created in 1958.

The color goldenrod is a representation of the color of some of the deeper-colored goldenrod flowers.

The first known recorded use of goldenrod as a color name in English was in 1915.

== Variations of goldenrod ==
=== Light goldenrod yellow ===
Light Goldenrod Yellow

Color coordinates
- Hex triplet: #FAFAD2
- sRGB^{B} (r, g, b): (250, 250, 210)
- HSV (h, s, v): (60°, 16%, 98%)
- CIELCh_{uv} (L, C, h): (97, 30, 86°)
- Source: X11
- ISCC–NBS descriptor: Light yellow green
- B: Normalized to [0–255] (byte)

The web color light goldenrod yellow is displayed at right.

=== Pale goldenrod ===
Pale Goldenrod

Color coordinates
- Hex triplet: #EEE8AA
- sRGB^{B} (r, g, b): (238, 232, 170)
- HSV (h, s, v): (55°, 29%, 93%)
- CIELCh_{uv} (L, C, h): (91, 45, 81°)
- Source: X11
- ISCC–NBS descriptor: Pale greenish yellow
- B: Normalized to [0–255] (byte)

The web color pale goldenrod is displayed at right.

=== Light goldenrod ===
Light Goldenrod

Color coordinates
- Hex triplet: #FFEC8B
- sRGB^{B} (r, g, b): (255, 236, 139)
- HSV (h, s, v): (50°, 45%, 100%)
- CIELCh_{uv} (L, C, h): (93, 68, 75°)
- Source: X11
- ISCC–NBS descriptor: Light greenish yellow
- B: Normalized to [0–255] (byte)

The web color light goldenrod is displayed at right.

=== Dark goldenrod ===
Dark Goldenrod

Color coordinates
- Hex triplet: #B8860B
- sRGB^{B} (r, g, b): (184, 134, 11)
- HSV (h, s, v): (43°, 94%, 72%)
- CIELCh_{uv} (L, C, h): (59, 73, 55°)
- Source: X11
- ISCC–NBS descriptor: Strong yellowish brown
- B: Normalized to [0–255] (byte)

The web color dark goldenrod is displayed at right.

== Symbolism ==
- It is the color of paper that the Church of Scientology's Ethics Department prints its suppressive person declarations on, giving rise to the term "golden-rodding".
- Goldenrod is the name of a city in Pokémon Gold, Silver and Crystal, and their remakes Pokémon HeartGold and SoulSilver.
- The cartoon sitcom 'The Simpsons' referenced Goldenrod in the episode Pygmoelian. In the episode the show within a show 'It Never Ends' producers use Goldenrod coloured pages to signify certain storylines in their scripts.

== See also ==
- List of colors
