= Shades of cyan =

Varieties of the color cyan

Cyan

Color coordinates
- Hex triplet: #00FFFF
- sRGB^{B} (r, g, b): (0, 255, 255)
- HSV (h, s, v): (180°, 100%, 100%)
- CIELCh_{uv} (L, C, h): (91, 72, 192°)
- Source: CSS Color Module Level 3
- B: Normalized to [0–255] (byte)

The color cyan, a color between green and blue, has notable tints and shades. It is one of the subtractive primary colors, along with magenta and yellow.

The first recorded use of cyan blue as a color name was in 1879 ("cyan blue" being the name used for "cyan" in the 19th century).

== Cyan in printing and the web colors cyan and aqua ==
=== Process cyan ===
Cyan (subtractive primary)
- Cyan, magenta, and yellow are the three subtractive primary colors used in printing.

Color coordinates
- Hex triplet: #00B7EB
- sRGB^{B} (r, g, b): (0, 183, 235)
- HSV (h, s, v): (193°, 100%, 92%)
- CIELCh_{uv} (L, C, h): (69, 74, 229°)
- Source: Pantone
- ISCC–NBS descriptor: Brilliant greenish blue
- B: Normalized to [0–255] (byte)

In color printing, the shade of cyan called process cyan or pigment cyan is one of the three primary pigment colors which, along with yellow and magenta, constitute the three subtractive primary colors of pigment. (The secondary colors of pigment are blue, green and red.) As such, the CMYK printing process was invented in the 1890s, when newspapers began to publish color comic strips.

Process cyan is not an RGB color, and there is no fixed conversion from CMYK primaries to RGB. Different formulations are used for printer's ink, so there can be variations in the printed color that is pure cyan ink. A typical formulation of process cyan is shown in the color box adjacent. The source of the color shown adjacent is the color cyan that is shown in the diagram located at the bottom of the tintbooks for CMYK printing.

=== The web color cyan (aqua) ===
Cyan (additive secondary)
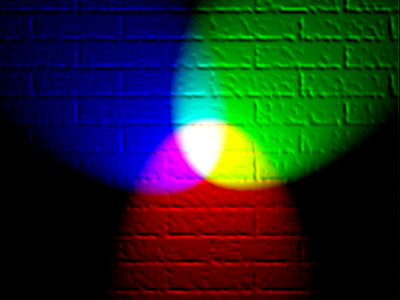
- Red, green and blue lights, representing the three basic additive primary colors of the RGB color system, red, green, and blue. Cyan light is composed of equal amounts of green and blue light.

Color coordinates
- Hex triplet: #00FFFF
- sRGB^{B} (r, g, b): (0, 255, 255)
- HSV (h, s, v): (180°, 100%, 100%)
- CIELCh_{uv} (L, C, h): (91, 72, 192°)
- Source: X11
- ISCC–NBS descriptor: Brilliant bluish green
- B: Normalized to [0–255] (byte)

The web color cyan, shown adjacent, is one of the three secondary colors in the RGB color model, used for creating all colors on a computer or television display by mixing various combinations of red, green and blue light. The X11 name for this color is cyan; the HTML name for the same color is aqua. They are both composed of the same mixture of blue and green light, and are exactly the same color.

5x5 square of variations of cyan. All color are within the range for cyan, which is 165-195, with RGB, HSL & web labels added.

== Additional variations of cyan ==
=== Azure (web) ===
Azure (web)

Color coordinates
- Hex triplet: #F0FFFF
- sRGB^{B} (r, g, b): (240, 255, 255)
- HSV (h, s, v): (180°, 6%, 100%)
- CIELCh_{uv} (L, C, h): (99, 8, 192°)
- Source: X11
- ISCC–NBS descriptor: Very pale green
- B: Normalized to [0–255] (byte)

In an artistic context, this color could also be called azure mist or cyan mist. Despite its name, this color is a lighter shade of cyan rather than a shade of azure.

=== Blue-green ===
Blue-green

Color coordinates
- Hex triplet: #0D98BA
- sRGB^{B} (r, g, b): (13, 152, 186)
- HSV (h, s, v): (192°, 93%, 73%)
- CIELCh_{uv} (L, C, h): (58, 56, 224°)
- Source: Crayola
- ISCC–NBS descriptor: Strong greenish blue
- B: Normalized to [0–255] (byte)

Blue-green has been a Crayola color since 1930.

=== Caribbean Current ===
Caribbean Current

Color coordinates
- Hex triplet: #006D6F
- sRGB^{B} (r, g, b): (0, 109, 111)
- HSV (h, s, v): (181°, 100%, 44%)
- CIELCh_{uv} (L, C, h): (41, 33, 195°)
- Source: Behr
- ISCC–NBS descriptor: Moderate bluish green
- B: Normalized to [0–255] (byte)

Displayed adjacent is the color Caribbean Current.

=== Celeste ===
Celeste

Color coordinates
- Hex triplet: #B2FFFF
- sRGB^{B} (r, g, b): (178, 255, 255)
- HSV (h, s, v): (180°, 30%, 100%)
- CIELCh_{uv} (L, C, h): (95, 38, 192°)
- Source: Il dizionario dei colori
- ISCC–NBS descriptor: Very light bluish green
- B: Normalized to [0–255] (byte)

Adjacent is displayed the color celeste.

Bleu celeste ("sky blue") is a rarely occurring tincture in heraldry (not being one of the seven main colors or metals or the three "staynard colors"). This tincture is sometimes also called ciel or simply celeste. It is depicted in a lighter shade than the range of shades of the more traditional tincture azure, which is the standard blue used in heraldry. It has been used rarely since the 17th century, gaining popularity after the First World War.

=== Charleston green ===
Charleston green

Color coordinates
- Hex triplet: #232B2B
- sRGB^{B} (r, g, b): (35, 43, 43)
- HSV (h, s, v): (180°, 19%, 17%)
- CIELCh_{uv} (L, C, h): (17, 3, 192°)
- Source: Duron Paints
- ISCC–NBS descriptor: Blackish green
- B: Normalized to [0–255] (byte)

Charleston green is an extremely dark shade of cyan. The name Charleston green originated after the American Civil War, approximately 1865, when during Reconstruction, it was widely used to paint homes in Charleston, South Carolina.

=== Connor's Lakefront ===
Connor's Lakefront is a dark shade of greenish blue. It is one of the Sherwin-Williams paint colors.

Connor's Lakefront (SW 9060)

Color coordinates
- Hex triplet: #175A6C
- sRGB^{B} (r, g, b): (23, 90, 108)
- HSV (h, s, v): (193°, 79%, 42%)
- CIELCh_{uv} (L, C, h): (35, 30, 221°)
- ISCC–NBS descriptor: Very dark cyan
- B: Normalized to [0–255] (byte)

=== Dark cyan ===
Dark cyan

Color coordinates
- Hex triplet: #008B8B
- sRGB^{B} (r, g, b): (0, 139, 139)
- HSV (h, s, v): (180°, 100%, 55%)
- CIELCh_{uv} (L, C, h): (52, 41, 192°)
- Source: X11
- ISCC–NBS descriptor: Strong bluish green
- B: Normalized to [0–255] (byte)

Adjacent is displayed the web color dark cyan.

=== Electric blue ===
Electric blue

Color coordinates
- Hex triplet: #7DF9FF
- sRGB^{B} (r, g, b): (125, 249, 255)
- HSV (h, s, v): (183°, 51%, 100%)
- CIELCh_{uv} (L, C, h): (91, 55, 197°)
- ISCC–NBS descriptor: Brilliant bluish green
- B: Normalized to [0–255] (byte)

Electric blue is a color close to cyan that is a representation of the color of lightning, an electric spark, and argon signs; it is named after the ionized air glow produced during electrical discharges.

The first recorded use of electric blue as a color name in English was in 1884.

=== Keppel ===
Keppel

Color coordinates
- Hex triplet: #3AB09E
- sRGB^{B} (r, g, b): (58, 176, 158)
- HSV (h, s, v): (171°, 67%, 69%)
- CIELCh_{uv} (L, C, h): (65, 46, 174°)
- Source: Xona.com Color List
- ISCC–NBS descriptor: Brilliant bluish green
- B: Normalized to [0–255] (byte)

Adjacent is displayed the color keppel.

The color name keppel has been in use since 2001, when it was promulgated as one of the colors on the Xona.com Color List.

=== Light cyan ===
Light cyan

Color coordinates
- Hex triplet: #E0FFFF
- sRGB^{B} (r, g, b): (224, 255, 255)
- HSV (h, s, v): (180°, 12%, 100%)
- CIELCh_{uv} (L, C, h): (98, 17, 192°)
- Source: X11
- ISCC–NBS descriptor: Very pale green
- B: Normalized to [0–255] (byte)

Adjacent is displayed the web color light cyan.

=== Light sea green ===
Light sea green
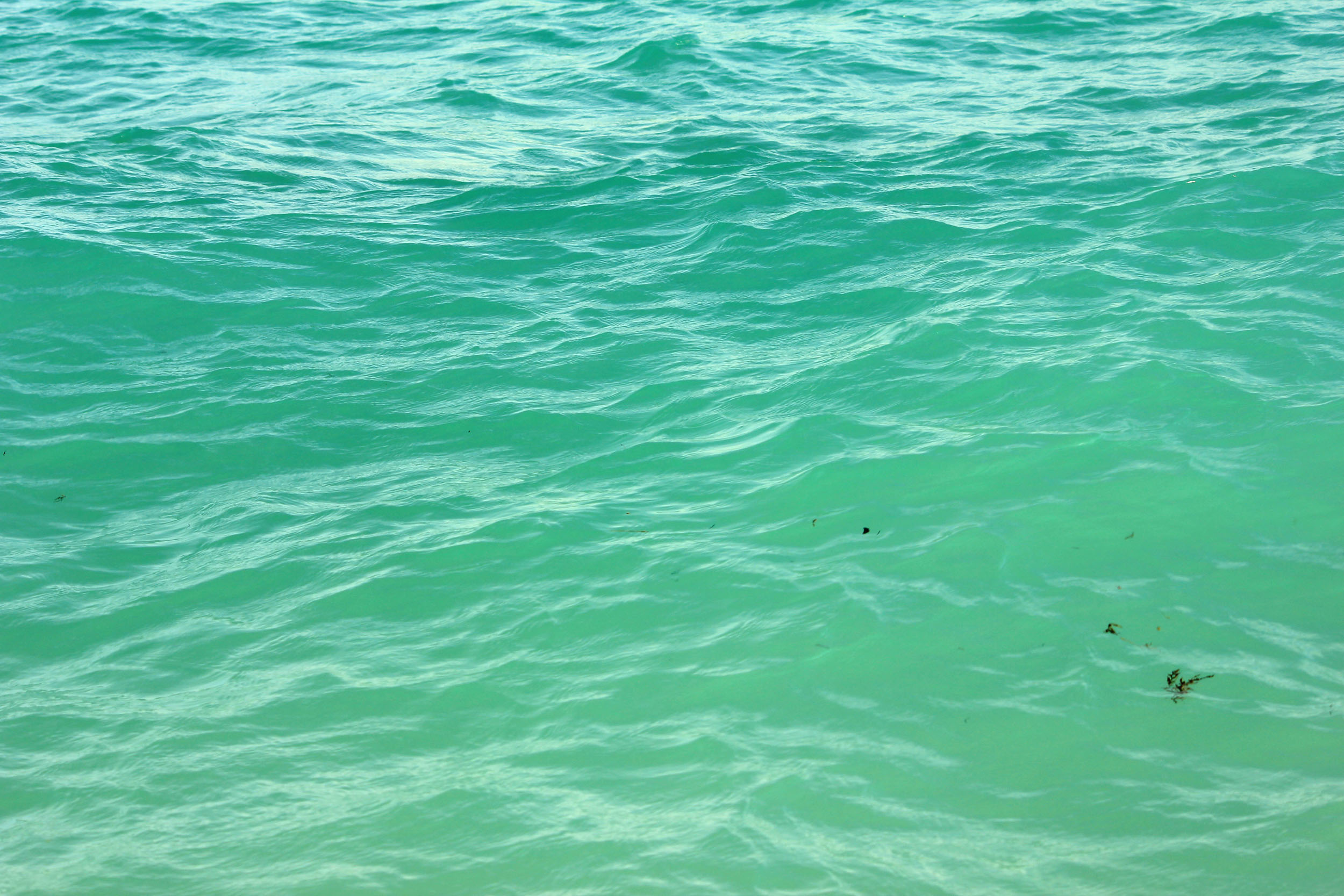

Color coordinates
- Hex triplet: #20B2AA
- sRGB^{B} (r, g, b): (32, 178, 170)
- HSV (h, s, v): (177°, 82%, 70%)
- CIELCh_{uv} (L, C, h): (66, 50, 184°)
- Source: X11
- ISCC–NBS descriptor: Brilliant bluish green
- B: Normalized to [0–255] (byte)

Adjacent is displayed the web color light sea green.

=== Midnight green ===
Midnight green
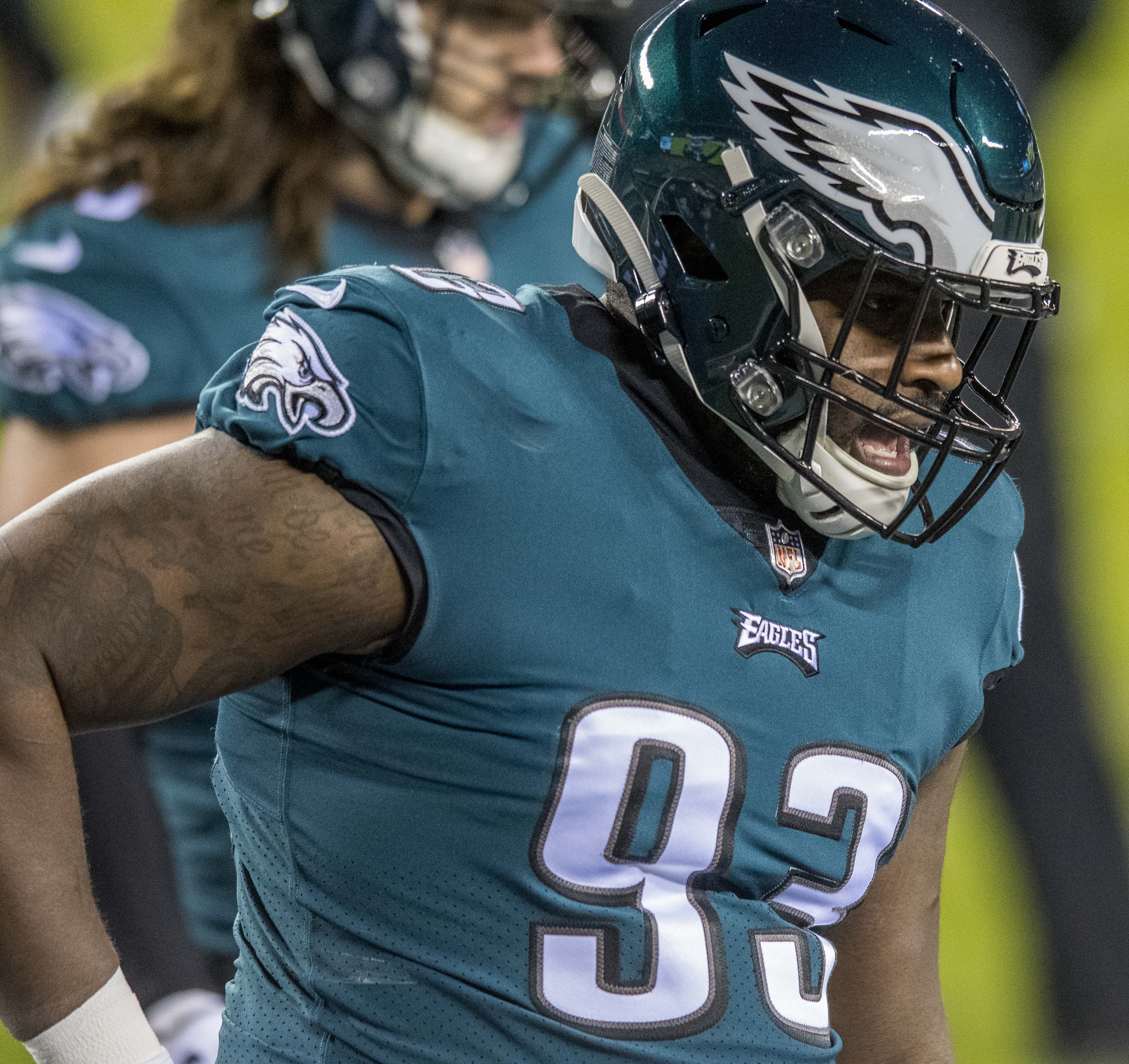
- Philadelphia Eagles player wearing the midnight-green uniform

Color coordinates
- Hex triplet: #004C54
- sRGB^{B} (r, g, b): (0, 76, 84)
- HSV (h, s, v): (186°, 100%, 33%)
- CIELCh_{uv} (L, C, h): (29, 24, 207°)
- Source: Colorhexa, the Philadelphia Eagles 2017 Media Guide
- ISCC–NBS descriptor: Dark bluish green
- B: Normalized to [0–255] (byte)

Midnight green (sometimes also called Eagle green) is a dark cyan.

It has been the primary team color for the National Football League team Philadelphia Eagles since 1996.

=== Moonstone ===
Moonstone
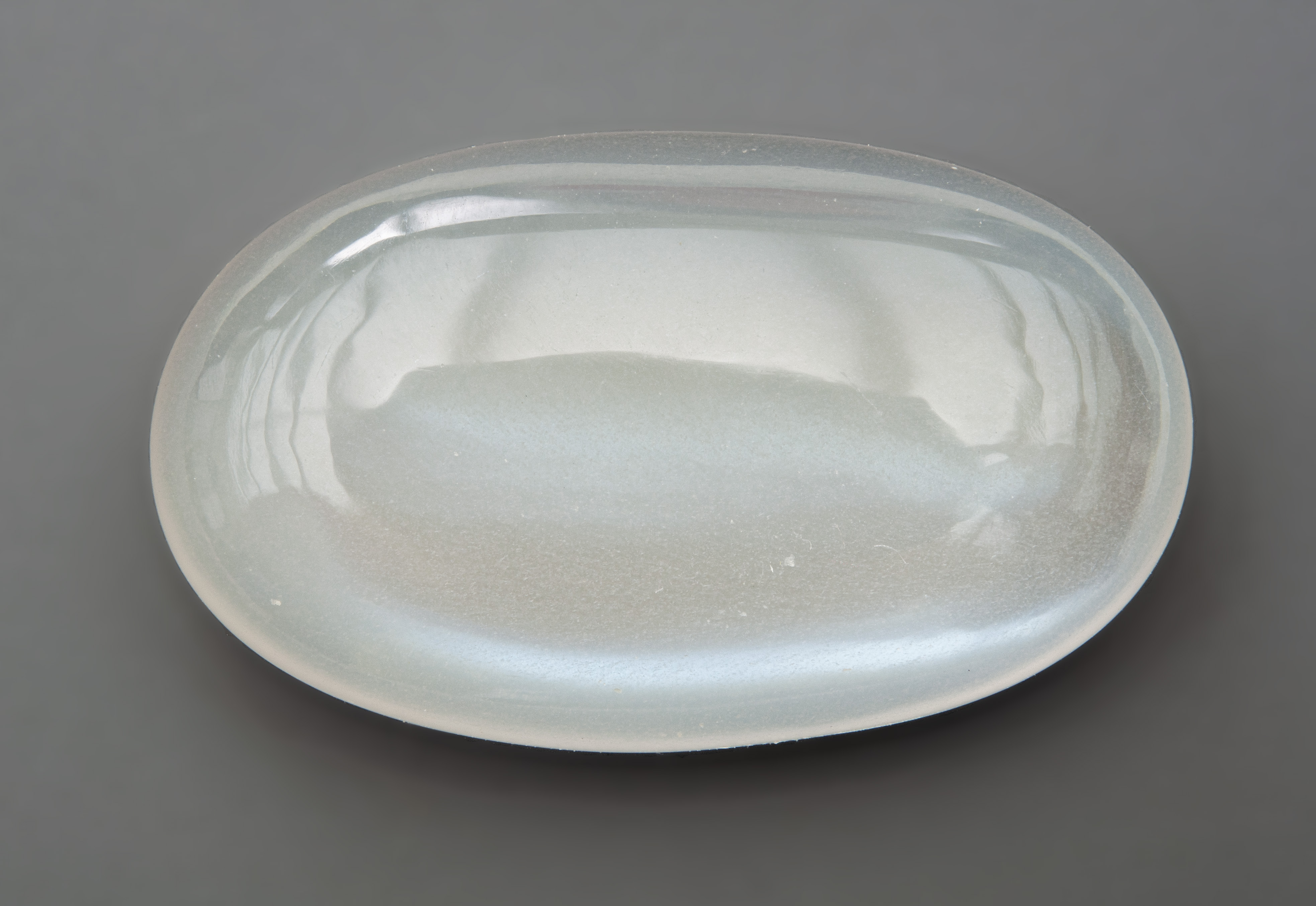
- A moonstone

Color coordinates
- Hex triplet: #3AA8C1
- sRGB^{B} (r, g, b): (58, 168, 193)
- HSV (h, s, v): (191°, 70%, 76%)
- CIELCh_{uv} (L, C, h): (64, 51, 217°)
- Source: Crayola
- B: Normalized to [0–255] (byte)

Displayed adjacent is the colour moonstone.

It was formulated by Crayola in 1994 as part of their Gem Tones range of crayons. It is a slightly dark shade of cyan that is reminiscent of the bluish-green schiller of some moonstones.

=== Myrtle green ===
Myrtle green
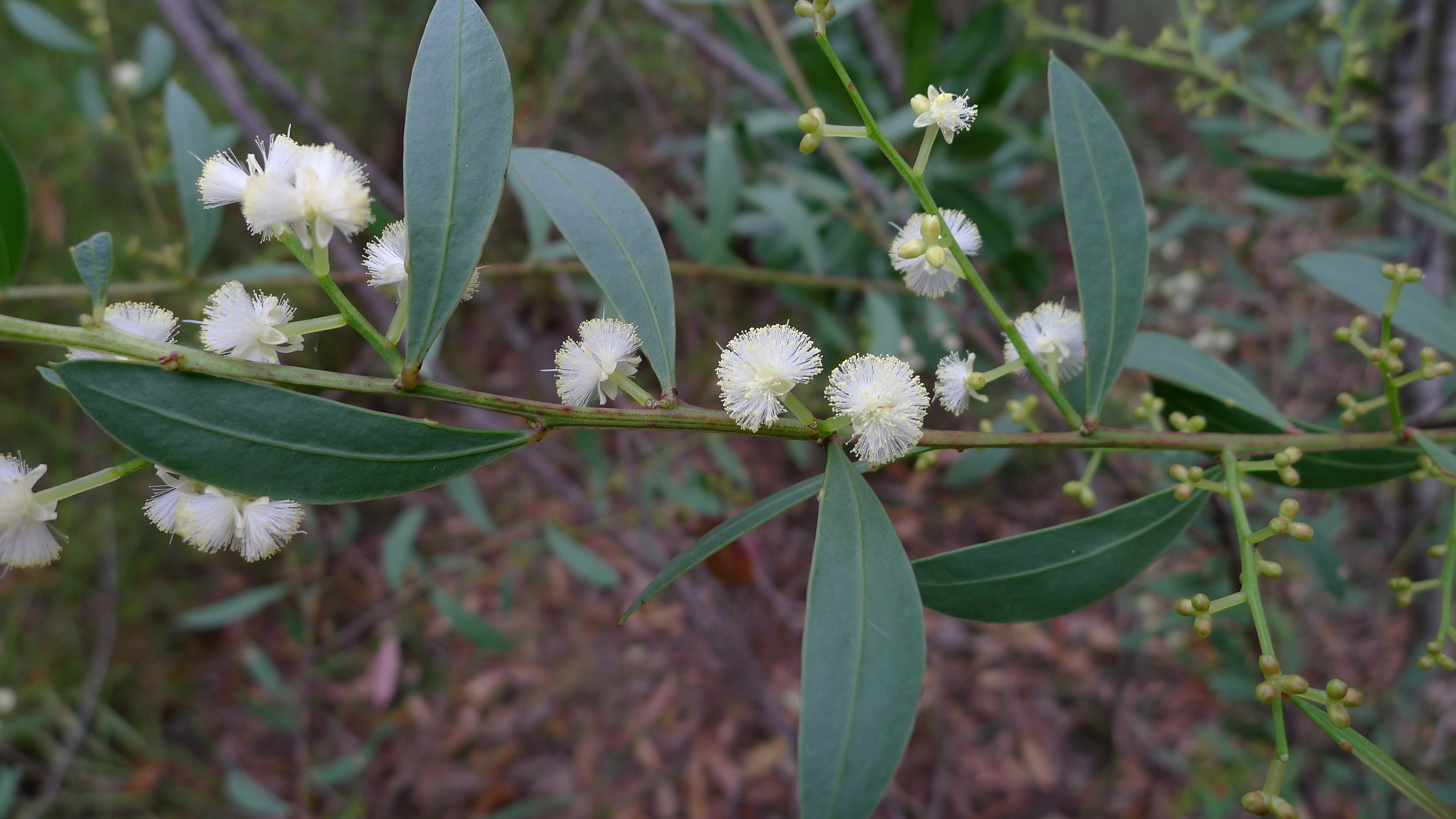
- Acacia myrtifolia

Color coordinates
- Hex triplet: #317873
- sRGB^{B} (r, g, b): (49, 120, 115)
- HSV (h, s, v): (176°, 59%, 47%)
- CIELCh_{uv} (L, C, h): (46, 29, 184°)
- Source: ISCC-NBS
- ISCC–NBS descriptor: Moderate bluish green
- B: Normalized to [0–255] (byte)

Myrtle green, also called myrtle, is a color which is a representation of the color of the leaves of the myrtle plant.

The first recorded use of myrtle green as a color name in English was in 1835.

Myrtle is the official designation of the green stripes on Waterloo rugby club's shirts, the green of Hunslet rugby league club, the green (along with the cardinal red) stripes of the South Sydney Rabbitohs and the green of the blazers, sports kit and scarf of St. Aloysius' College, Glasgow. It is also one of the school colors of Lane Technical College Prep High School in Chicago, the other being old gold.

The baggy green, the cricket cap worn by Australian Test cricketers since around the turn of the 20th century, is myrtle green in color.

=== Peacock blue ===
Peacock blue
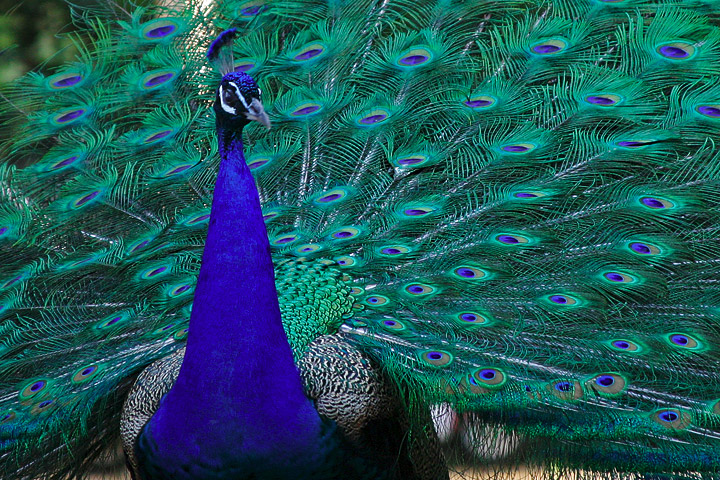
- Peacock (Pavo cristatus)

Color coordinates
- Hex triplet: #004958
- sRGB^{B} (r, g, b): (0, 73, 88)
- HSV (h, s, v): (190°, 100%, 35%)
- CIELCh_{uv} (L, C, h): (28, 26, 219°)
- Source: NBS/ISCC – Plochere Color System
- ISCC–NBS descriptor: Dark greenish blue
- B: Normalized to [0–255] (byte)

The color peacock blue is a deep greenish blue, from the iridescent color of a peacock. As a color between blue and cyan, peacock blue has been used as the process-blue ink in four-color printing.

Kelly Moore Paint's "color of the year" for 2019 was their peacock blue.

=== Robin egg blue ===
Robin egg blue
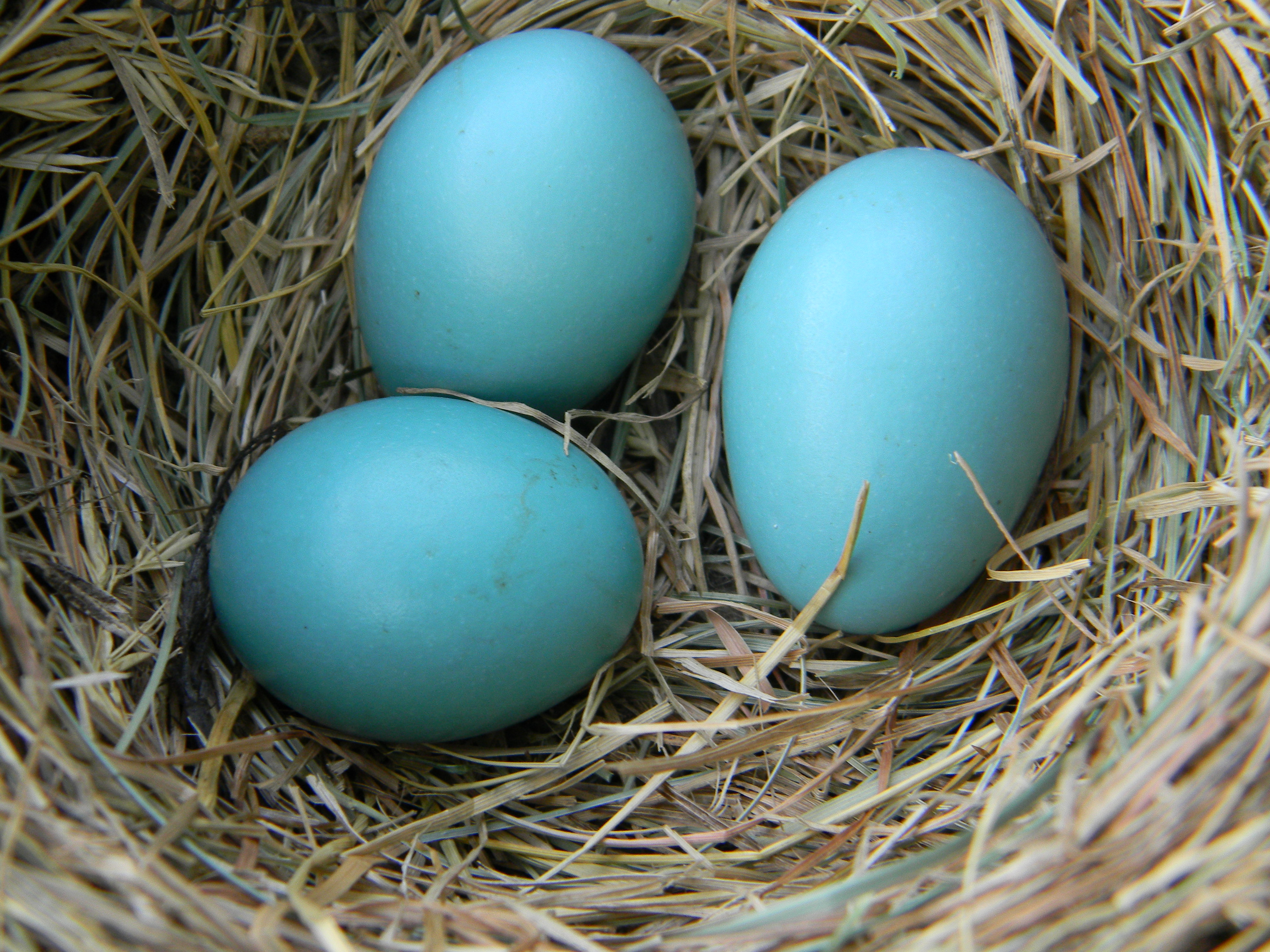
- A set of three Robin eggs in a nest

Color coordinates
- Hex triplet: #00CCCC
- sRGB^{B} (r, g, b): (0, 204, 204)
- HSV (h, s, v): (180°, 100%, 80%)
- CIELCh_{uv} (L, C, h): (75, 59, 192°)
- Source: Crayola
- ISCC–NBS descriptor: Brilliant bluish green
- B: Normalized to [0–255] (byte)

The color robin egg blue is displayed adjacent.

The first recorded use of robin's egg blue as a color name in English was in 1873.

=== Skobeloff ===
Skobeloff

Color coordinates
- Hex triplet: #007474
- sRGB^{B} (r, g, b): (0, 116, 116)
- HSV (h, s, v): (180°, 100%, 45%)
- CIELCh_{uv} (L, C, h): (44, 35, 192°)
- Source: ISCC-NBS
- ISCC–NBS descriptor: Moderate bluish green
- B: Normalized to [0–255] (byte)

Adjacent is displayed the color Skobeloff green.

The first recorded use of Skobeloff green as a color name in English was in 1912.

=== Sky blue (Crayola) ===
Sky blue (Crayola)
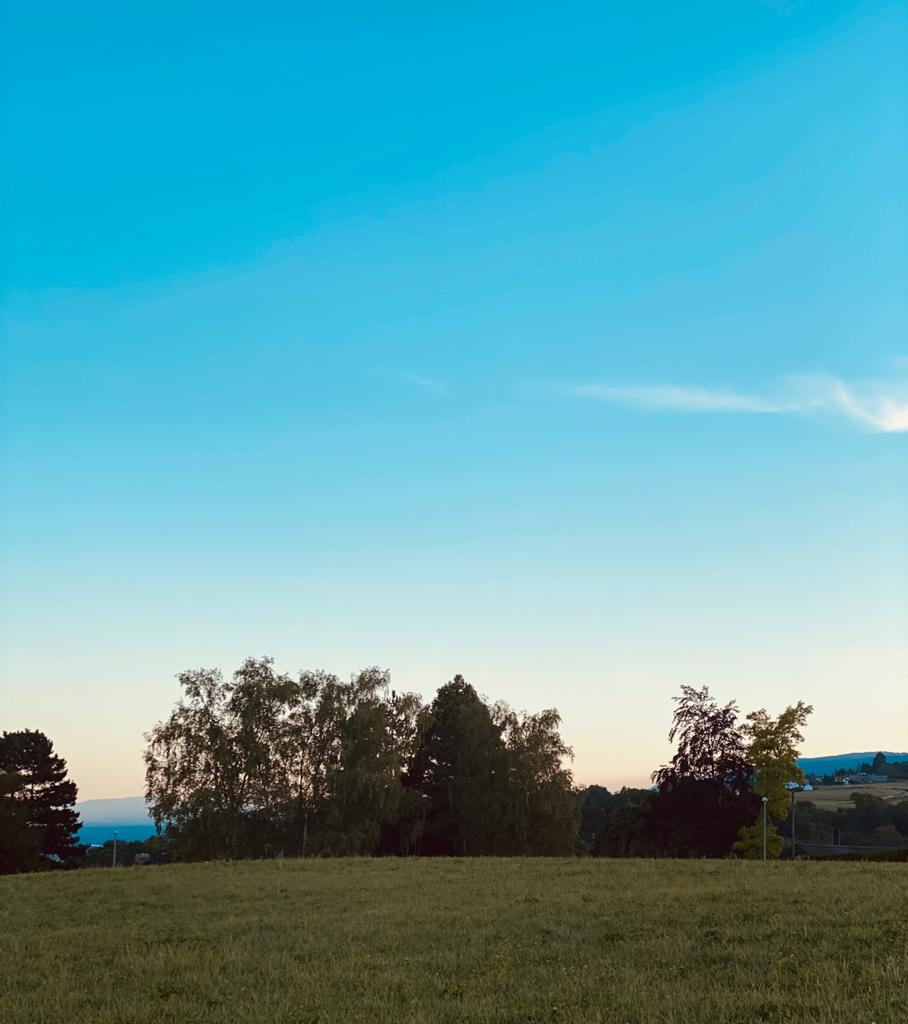

Color coordinates
- Hex triplet: #80DAEB
- sRGB^{B} (r, g, b): (128, 218, 235)
- HSV (h, s, v): (190°, 46%, 92%)
- CIELCh_{uv} (L, C, h): (82, 46, 210°)
- Source: Crayola
- ISCC–NBS descriptor: Very light greenish blue
- B: Normalized to [0–255] (byte)

Displayed at adjacent is the color medium sky blue. This is the color that is called sky blue in Crayola crayons. This color was formulated by Crayola in 1958. "Sky blue" appears in the 32, 48, 64, 96 and 120 packs of crayons.

=== Teal ===
Teal
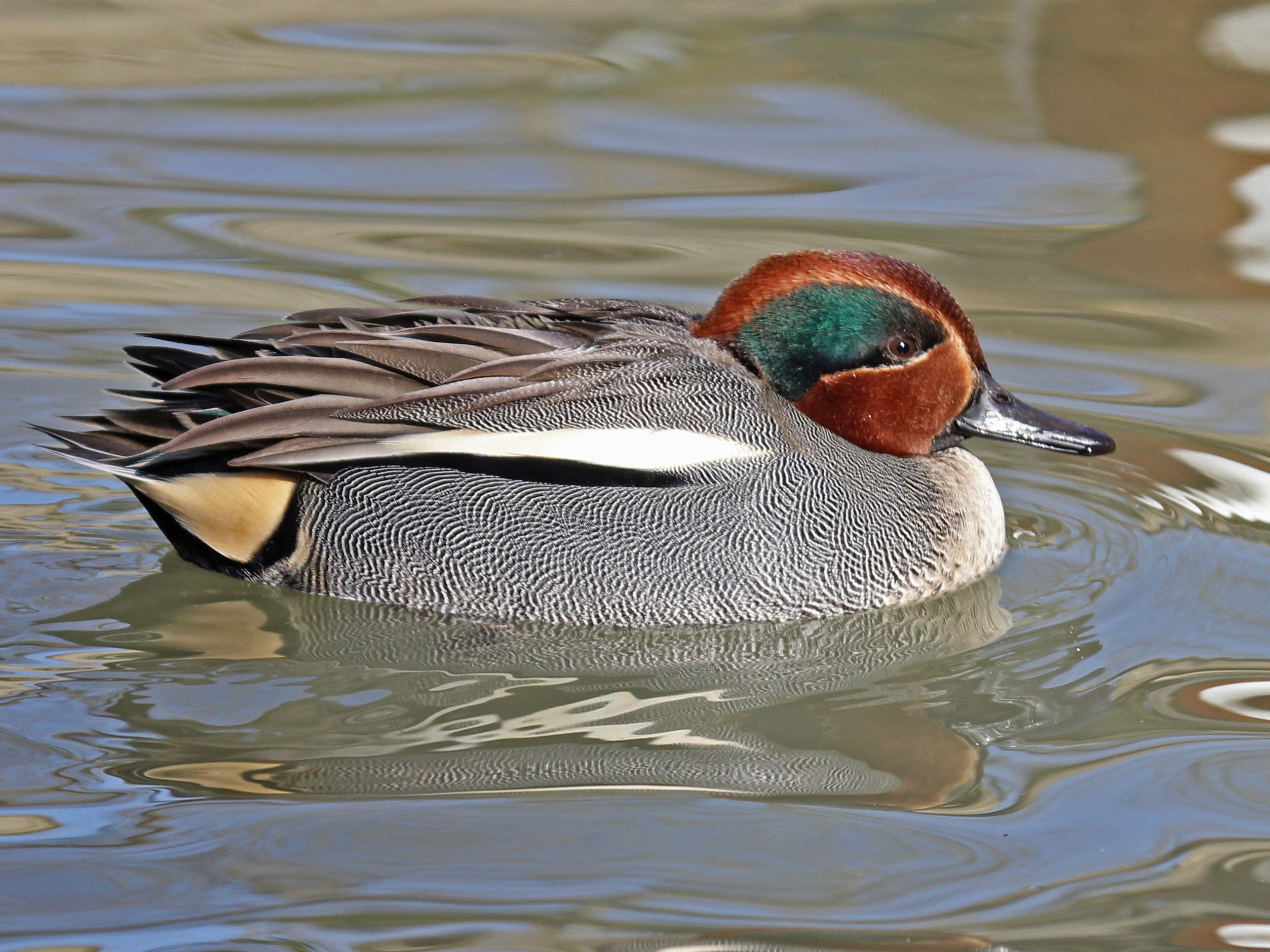
- Eurasian teal

Color coordinates
- Hex triplet: #008080
- sRGB^{B} (r, g, b): (0, 128, 128)
- HSV (h, s, v): (180°, 100%, 50%)
- CIELCh_{uv} (L, C, h): (48, 38, 192°)
- Source: HTML/CSS
- ISCC–NBS descriptor: Moderate bluish green
- B: Normalized to [0–255] (byte)

Adjacent is displayed the web color teal. The first recorded use of teal as a color name in English was in 1917. Like the lighter cyan, teal is exactly halfway between blue and green.

=== Technobotanica ===
Technobotanica

Color coordinates
- Hex triplet: #00FFBF
- sRGB^{B} (r, g, b): (0, 255, 191)
- HSV (h, s, v): (165°, 100%, 100%)
- CIELCh_{uv} (L, C, h): (90, 83, 155°)
- Source: ColorSite.com
- ISCC–NBS descriptor: Vivid green
- B: Normalized to [0–255] (byte)

Displayed adjacent is the color technobotanica.

Technobotanica is one of the quaternary colors on the RGB color wheel, being halfway between spring green and cyan.

=== Tiffany Blue ===
Tiffany Blue
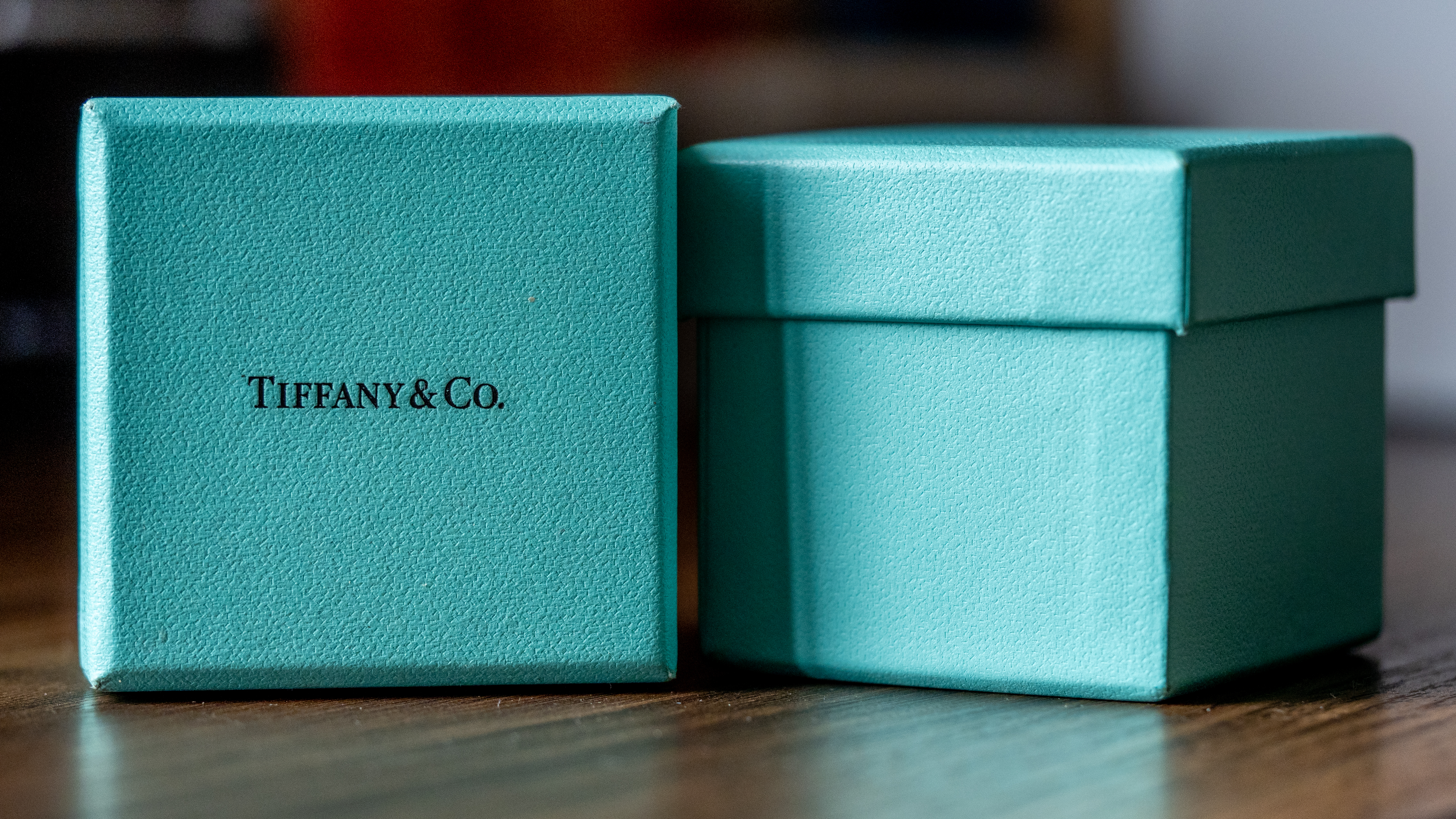
- A pair of Tiffany & Co. boxes showing the distinct shade of cyan

Color coordinates
- Hex triplet: #81D8D0
- sRGB^{B} (r, g, b): (129, 216, 208)
- HSV (h, s, v): (174°, 40%, 85%)
- CIELCh_{uv} (L, C, h): (81, 40, 183°)
- Source: press.tiffany.comTiffany.com
- ISCC–NBS descriptor: Very light bluish green
- B: Normalized to [0–255] (byte)

Tiffany Blue is the colloquial name for the light medium robin egg blue color associated with Tiffany & Co., the New York City jewelry company. The color was used on the cover of Tiffany's Blue Book, first published in 1845. Since then, Tiffany & Co. has used the color extensively on promotional materials, including boxes and bags. The Tiffany Blue color is protected as a color trademark by Tiffany & Co. in some jurisdictions (including the U.S.).

=== Turquoise ===
Turquoise
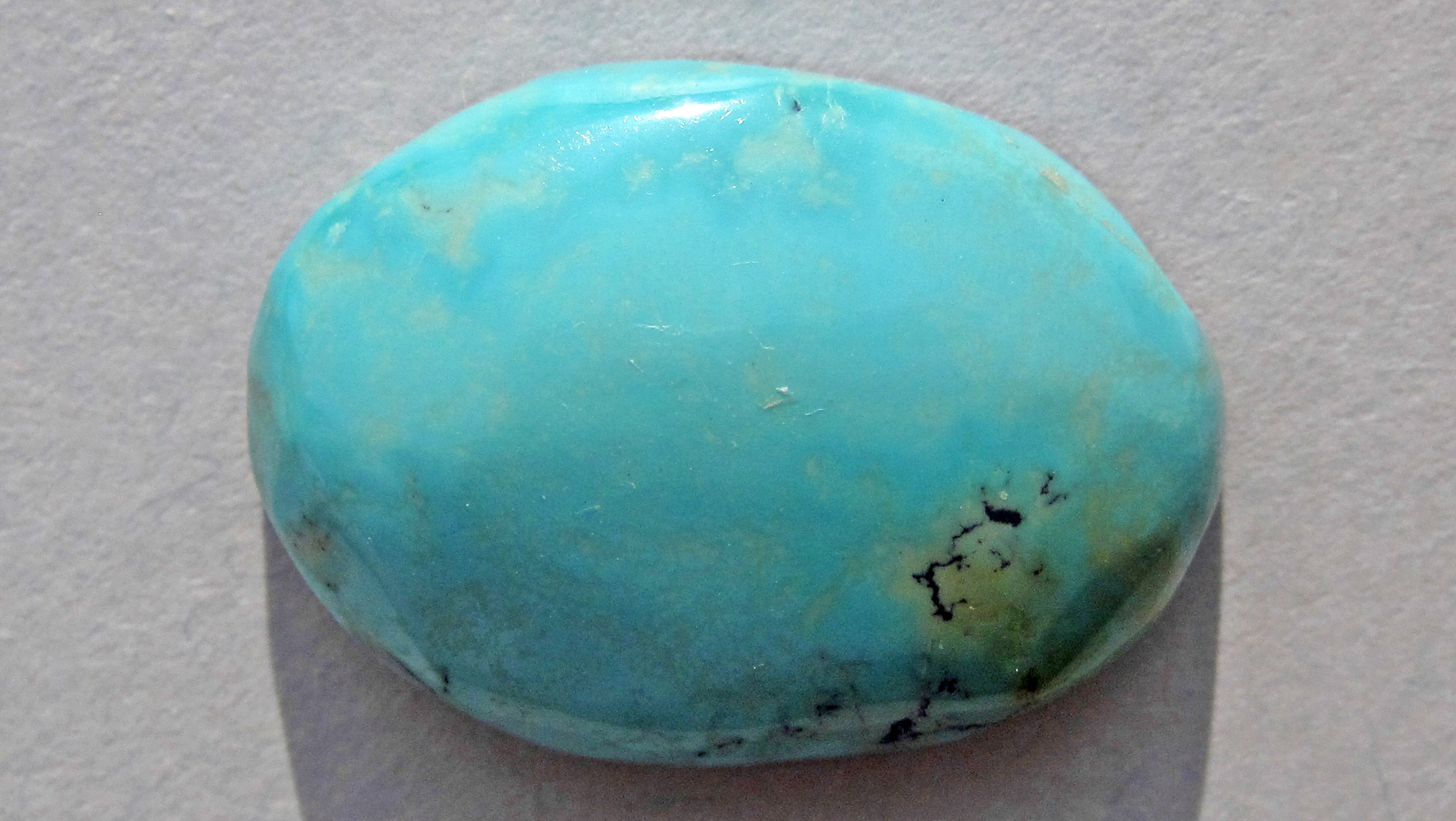
- Polished turquoise stone

Color coordinates
- Hex triplet: #40E0D0
- sRGB^{B} (r, g, b): (64, 224, 208)
- HSV (h, s, v): (174°, 71%, 88%)
- CIELCh_{uv} (L, C, h): (81, 59, 179°)
- Source: X11
- ISCC–NBS descriptor: Brilliant bluish green
- B: Normalized to [0–255] (byte)

Adjacent is displayed the X11 color named turquoise.

Turquoise is the name of a greenish blue color, based on the gem of the same name. The word turquoise comes from the French for Turkish, as the gem was originally imported from Turkey.

The first recorded use of turquoise as a color name in English was in 1573. Perhaps owing to sharing its name with a mineral, turquoise is currently a more common term in English than other cyan-like colors.

=== Verdigris ===
Verdigris
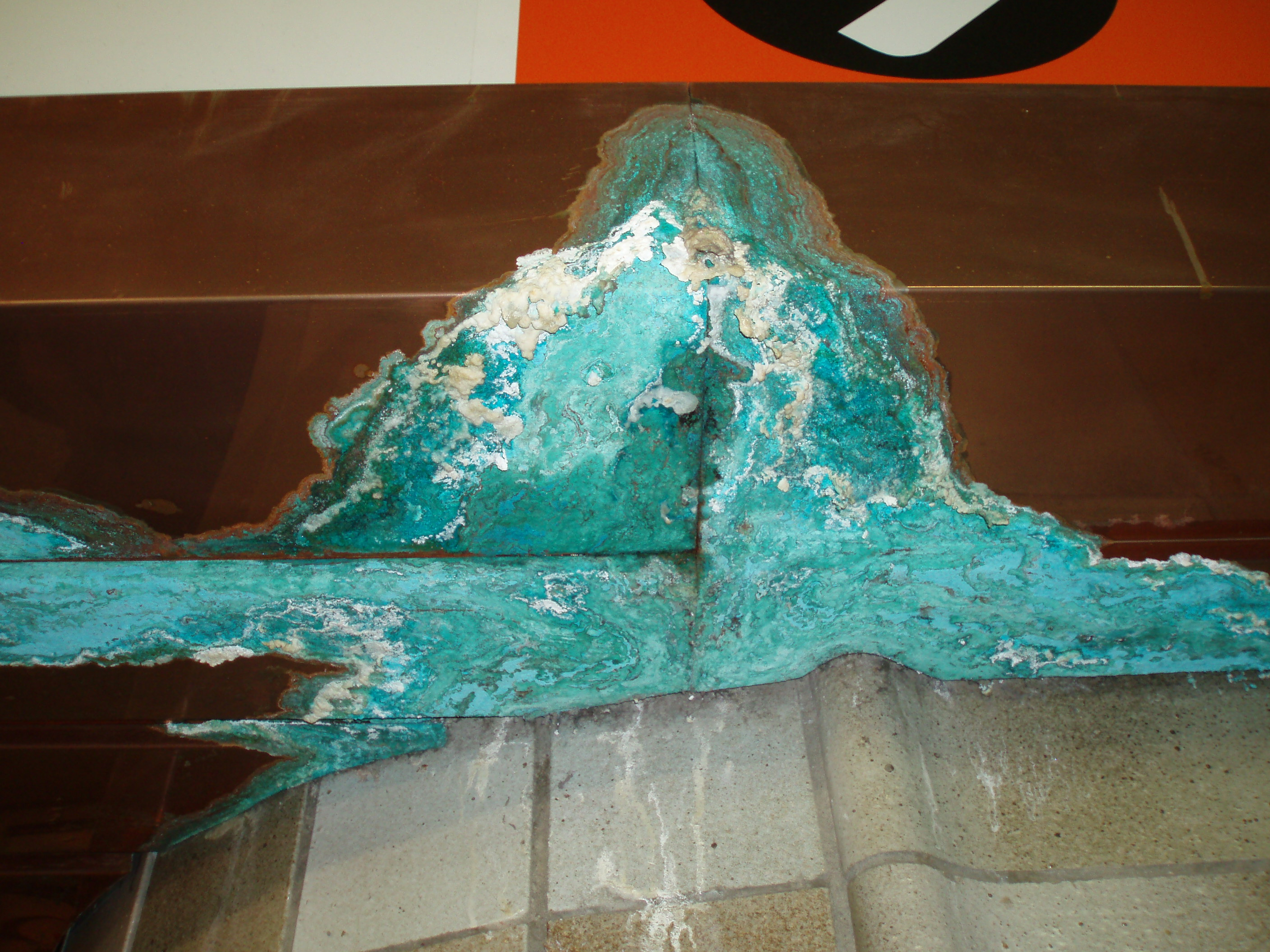
- Verdigris

Color coordinates
- Hex triplet: #43B3AE
- sRGB^{B} (r, g, b): (67, 179, 174)
- HSV (h, s, v): (177°, 63%, 70%)
- CIELCh_{uv} (L, C, h): (67, 45, 187°)
- Source: https://encycolorpedia.com/43b3ae
- ISCC–NBS descriptor: Brilliant bluish green
- B: Normalized to [0–255] (byte)

Verdigris is the common name for a green pigment obtained through the application of acetic acid to copper plates or the natural patina formed when copper, brass or bronze is weathered and exposed to air or seawater over a period of time. The name verdigris comes from the Middle English vertegrez, from the Old French verte grez, an alteration of vert-de-Grèce ("green of Greece"). Used as a pigment in paintings and other art objects (as green color) since ancient Greece, it was originally made by hanging copper plates over hot vinegar in a sealed pot until a green crust formed on the copper. The vivid green color of copper(II) acetate made this form of verdigris a much used pigment. Until the 19th century, verdigris was the most vibrant green pigment available and was frequently used in painting. Verdigris was sometimes used to illustrate cyan colors in early color wheels.

=== Zeal ===
Zeal

Color coordinates
- Hex triplet: #91E0B7
- sRGB^{B} (r, g, b): (145, 224, 183)
- HSV (h, s, v): (149°, 35%, 88%)
- CIELCh_{uv} (L, C, h): (83, 45, 148°)
- Source: Resene
- ISCC–NBS descriptor: Very light green
- B: Normalized to [0–255] (byte)

Displayed adjacent is the color zeal.

Zeal is one of the colors on the Resene Color List.

=== Zomp ===
Zomp

Color coordinates
- Hex triplet: #39A78D
- sRGB^{B} (r, g, b): (57, 167, 141)
- HSV (h, s, v): (166°, 66%, 65%)
- CIELCh_{uv} (L, C, h): (62, 46, 165°)
- Source: Resene
- ISCC–NBS descriptor: Brilliant green
- B: Normalized to [0–255] (byte)

Displayed adjacent is the color zomp.

Zomp is one of the colors on the Resene Color List.

=== Zydeco ===
Zydeco

Color coordinates
- Hex triplet: #20483F
- sRGB^{B} (r, g, b): (32, 72, 63)
- HSV (h, s, v): (166°, 56%, 28%)
- CIELCh_{uv} (L, C, h): (28, 17, 168°)
- Source: Resene
- ISCC–NBS descriptor: Dark bluish green
- B: Normalized to [0–255] (byte)

Displayed adjacent is the color zydeco.

Zydeco is one of the colors on the Resene Color List.

== See also ==
- Blue–green distinction in language
- Lists of colors
- Shades of magenta
- Shades of yellow
