= Murasaki =

Murasaki is the Japanese word for:

- Lithospermum erythrorhizon (ムラサキ), commonly called purple gromwell
- the colour purple (紫)

It may also refer to:

== People ==
- Murasaki Shikibu, author of The Tale of Genji
  - Murasaki no Ue, one of the main characters in The Tale of Genji
- Murasaki Shion, Japanese virtual YouTuber for Hololive Production
- Murasaki Yamada, Japanese feminist essayist, manga artist, and poet
- Murasaki Fujima, Japanese actress

== Fictional characters ==
- Lady Murasaki, a character from Tom Harris's Hannibal Rising
- Murasaki Kimidori, a character from the anime and manga series Dr. Slump
- Ninja Murasaki, a member of the Red Ribbon Army in the anime and manga series Dragon Ball
- Murasaki Kuhōin, a character from the light novel, anime and manga series Kure-nai
- Akane Kurashiki, who is nicknamed "Murasaki" in Nine Hours, Nine Persons, Nine Doors

== Books ==
- The Murasaki Shikibu Diary, diary written by Murasaki Shikibu
- Murasaki (novel), a 1992 science fiction novel by several authors, edited by Robert Silverberg

== Colours and dyes ==
- Fujimurasaki, nisemurasaki, kokimurasaki, murasaki, umemurasaki and murasakitobi, names for a number of shades of purple considered to be part of the traditional colors of Japan
- Kokimurasaki, the outerwear color of 1st rank aristocrats in the forbidden colors system of the Japanese Imperial Court from the 10th–11th century until the Meiji period (1867–1911)
- The Japanese word for Lithospermum erythrorhizon (purple gromwell) or the dye or made from its root

== Other uses ==
- Murasaki (band), a Japanese pop-punk band formed in 2020
- Murasaki (crater), a crater on planet Mercury, named after Murasaki Shikibu
- A station on the Nishitetsu Tenjin Ōmuta Line
- Murasaki 312, a fictional space phenomenon in Star Trek: The Original Series.
