= Shades of pink =

Varieties of the color pink

Pink

Common connotations
- femininity, love, Easter, Valentine's Day, homosexuality

Color coordinates
- Hex triplet: #FFC0CB
- sRGB^{B} (r, g, b): (255, 192, 203)
- HSV (h, s, v): (350°, 25%, 100%)
- CIELCh_{uv} (L, C, h): (84, 39, 1°)
- Source: HTML/CSS
- B: Normalized to [0–255] (byte)

Pink colors are usually light or desaturated shades of reds, roses, and magentas which are created on computer and television screens using the RGB color model and in printing with the CMYK color model. As such, it is an arbitrary classification of color.

Below is a list of some of the common pink colors.

== Web colors ==
=== Pink ===
Pink

Color coordinates
- Hex triplet: #FFC0CB
- sRGB^{B} (r, g, b): (255, 192, 203)
- HSV (h, s, v): (350°, 25%, 100%)
- CIELCh_{uv} (L, C, h): (84, 39, 1°)
- Source: X11 color names HTML/CSS
- ISCC–NBS descriptor: Light pink
- B: Normalized to [0–255] (byte)

Pink (#ffc0cb)
#ffc0cb

Displayed here is the web color pink.

=== Light pink ===
Light Pink

Color coordinates
- Hex triplet: #FFDEE4
- sRGB^{B} (r, g, b): (255, 222, 228)
- HSV (h, s, v): (349°, 13%, 100%)
- CIELCh_{uv} (L, C, h): (91, 19, 359°)
- Source: X11 color names HTML/CSS
- ISCC–NBS descriptor: Moderate pink
- B: Normalized to [0–255] (byte)

Light pink (#ffdee4)
#ffdee4

Displayed here is the web color light pink. The name of the web color is written as "lightpink" (no space) in HTML for computer display.

Although this color is called "light pink", as can be ascertained by inspecting its hex code, it is actually a slightly deeper, not a lighter, tint of pink than the color pink itself. A more accurate name for it in terms of traditional color nomenclature would therefore be medium light pink.

=== Hot pink ===
The pink triangle, always rendered in a tone of hot pink, has been used as an LGBTQ pride and LGBTQ rights symbol since the early 1970s

Hot Pink

Color coordinates
- Hex triplet: #FF69B4
- sRGB^{B} (r, g, b): (255, 105, 180)
- HSV (h, s, v): (330°, 59%, 100%)
- CIELCh_{uv} (L, C, h): (65, 95, 343°)
- Source: X11 color names HTML/CSS
- ISCC–NBS descriptor: Vivid purplish red
- B: Normalized to [0–255] (byte)

Hot pink (#ff69b4)
#ff69b4

Displayed here is the web color hot pink. The name of the web color is written as "hotpink" (no space) in HTML for computer display. This shade of pink, along with bubblegum pink, was a very popular aesthetic during the 2000s.

=== Deep pink ===
Deep Pink

Color coordinates
- Hex triplet: #FF1493
- sRGB^{B} (r, g, b): (255, 20, 147)
- HSV (h, s, v): (328°, 92%, 100%)
- CIELCh_{uv} (L, C, h): (56, 134, 350°)
- Source: X11 color names HTML/CSS
- ISCC–NBS descriptor: Vivid purplish red
- B: Normalized to [0–255] (byte)

Deep pink (#ff1493)
#ff1493

Displayed here is the web color deep pink. The name of the web color is written as "deeppink" (no space) in HTML for computer display.

=== Pastel pink ===
Pastel pink

Color coordinates
- Hex triplet: #FFD1DC
- sRGB^{B} (r, g, b): (255, 209, 220)
- HSV (h, s, v): (346°, 18%, 100%)
- CIELCh_{uv} (L, C, h): (88, 27, 355°)
- Source: ColorHexa.com
- B: Normalized to [0–255] (byte)

In Western culture, pastel pink is used to symbolize baby girls just as baby blue is often used to symbolize baby boys.

== Other notable pink colors ==
=== Amaranth pink ===
Amaranth Pink

Color coordinates
- Hex triplet: #F19CBB
- sRGB^{B} (r, g, b): (241, 156, 187)
- HSV (h, s, v): (338°, 35%, 95%)
- CIELCh_{uv} (L, C, h): (74, 53, 348°)
- Source: Maerz and Paul
- ISCC–NBS descriptor: Moderate purplish pink
- B: Normalized to [0–255] (byte)

Amaranth pink
#f19cbb

Displayed here is the color amaranth pink. This color is a representation of the color of pink amaranth flowers.

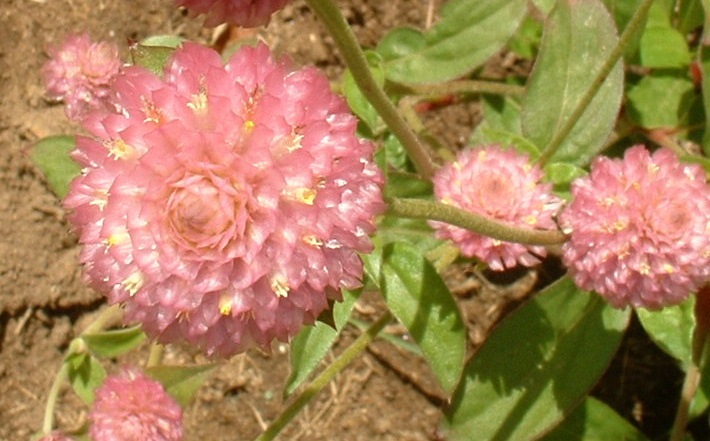
Pink globe amaranth

The first recorded use of amaranth pink as a color name in English was in 1905.

=== Baby pink ===
Baby Pink

Color coordinates
- Hex triplet: #F4C2C2
- sRGB^{B} (r, g, b): (244, 194, 194)
- HSV (h, s, v): (0°, 20%, 96%)
- CIELCh_{uv} (L, C, h): (83, 32, 12°)
- Source: ISCC-NBS
- ISCC–NBS descriptor: Moderate yellowish pink
- B: Normalized to [0–255] (byte)

Baby pink (#f4c2c2)
#f4c2c2

Displayed here is the color baby pink, a light shade of pink.

The first recorded use of baby pink as a color name in English was in 1928.

In Western culture, baby pink is used to symbolize baby girls just as baby blue is often used to symbolize baby boys (but see also the section Pink in gender in the main article on pink.)

=== Baker-Miller pink ===
Baker-Miller Pink

Color coordinates
- Hex triplet: #FF91AF
- sRGB^{B} (r, g, b): (255, 145, 175)
- HSV (h, s, v): (344°, 43%, 100%)
- CIELCh_{uv} (L, C, h): (73, 71, 356°)
- Source: cabinetmagazine.org
- ISCC–NBS descriptor: Strong purplish pink
- B: Normalized to [0–255] (byte)

Baker-Miller pink
#ff91af

Baker-Miller Pink is a tone of pink that was originally created by mixing one gallon of pure white indoor latex paint with one pint of red trim semi-gloss outdoor paint. It is named for the two U.S. Navy officers who first experimented with its use in 1979 at the Naval Correctional Facility in Seattle, Washington at the behest of researcher Alexander Schauss. The color is also known as Schauss pink, after Alexander Schauss' extensive research into the effects of the color on emotions and hormones, as well as P-618 and Drunk-Tank Pink.

Results of the use of this color to paint the interiors of correctional institutions has been mixed. Some prisoners have been calmed by the color, but others have been agitated and disturbed by it.

=== Barbie pink ===
Barbie Pink

Color coordinates
- Hex triplet: #DA1884
- sRGB^{B} (r, g, b): (218, 24, 132)
- HSV (h, s, v): (327°, 89%, 85%)
- CIELCh_{uv} (L, C, h): (49, 111, 347°)
- Source: Pantone
- ISCC–NBS descriptor: Vivid purplish red
- B: Normalized to [0–255] (byte)

Barbie pink
#da1884

Displayed here is the color Barbie pink, a deep shade of pink.

Pantone 219C is the color used by Mattel's Barbie in logos, packaging, and promotional materials.

=== Bright pink ===
Bright Pink

Color coordinates
- Hex triplet: #FF007F
- sRGB^{B} (r, g, b): (255, 0, 127)
- HSV (h, s, v): (330°, 100%, 100%)
- CIELCh_{uv} (L, C, h): (55, 143, 355°)
- B: Normalized to [0–255] (byte)

Bright pink (#ff007f)
#ff007f

Bright pink is a maximally saturated tone of pink that is another name for the color rose.

In most Indo-European languages, the color that in English is called pink is called rosa; therefore, the color that is called rose in English is called bright rosa in most European and Latin American countries (using whatever adjective in a particular language means bright in that language).

=== Bubblegum pink ===
Bubblegum Pink

Color coordinates
- Hex triplet: #F58092
- sRGB^{B} (r, g, b): (245, 128, 146)
- HSV (h, s, v): (351°, 48%, 96%)
- CIELCh_{uv} (L, C, h): (67, 80, 4°)
- Source: Crayola
- ISCC–NBS descriptor: Vivid purple
- B: Normalized to [0–255] (byte)

Bubblegum pink
#F58092

Displayed here is the color Bubblegum pink.

"Bubblegum pink" is a deep tone of magenta. This shade of pink, along with hot pink, were very popular during the 2000s.

=== Cameo pink ===
Cameo Pink

Color coordinates
- Hex triplet: #EFBBCC
- sRGB^{B} (r, g, b): (239, 187, 204)
- HSV (h, s, v): (340°, 22%, 94%)
- CIELCh_{uv} (L, C, h): (81, 31, 349°)
- Source: ISCC-NBS
- ISCC–NBS descriptor: Pale purplish pink
- B: Normalized to [0–255] (byte)

Cameo pink
#efbbcc

Displayed here is the color cameo pink, a medium light tone of rose pink.

The first recorded use of cameo pink as a color name in English was in 1912.

=== Charm pink ===
Charm Pink

Color coordinates
- Hex triplet: #E68FAC
- sRGB^{B} (r, g, b): (230, 143, 172)
- HSV (h, s, v): (340°, 38%, 90%)
- CIELCh_{uv} (L, C, h): (69, 55, 351°)
- Source: Plochere
- ISCC–NBS descriptor: Dark purplish pink
- B: Normalized to [0–255] (byte)

Charm pink
#e68fac

Displayed here is the color charm pink, a medium shade of purplish pink.

The color name charm pink first came into use in 1948.

The source of this color is the Plochere Color System, a color system formulated in 1948 that is widely used by interior designers.

"Charm pink" is a medium roseish tone of pink that is used in interior design.

=== Cherry blossom pink ===
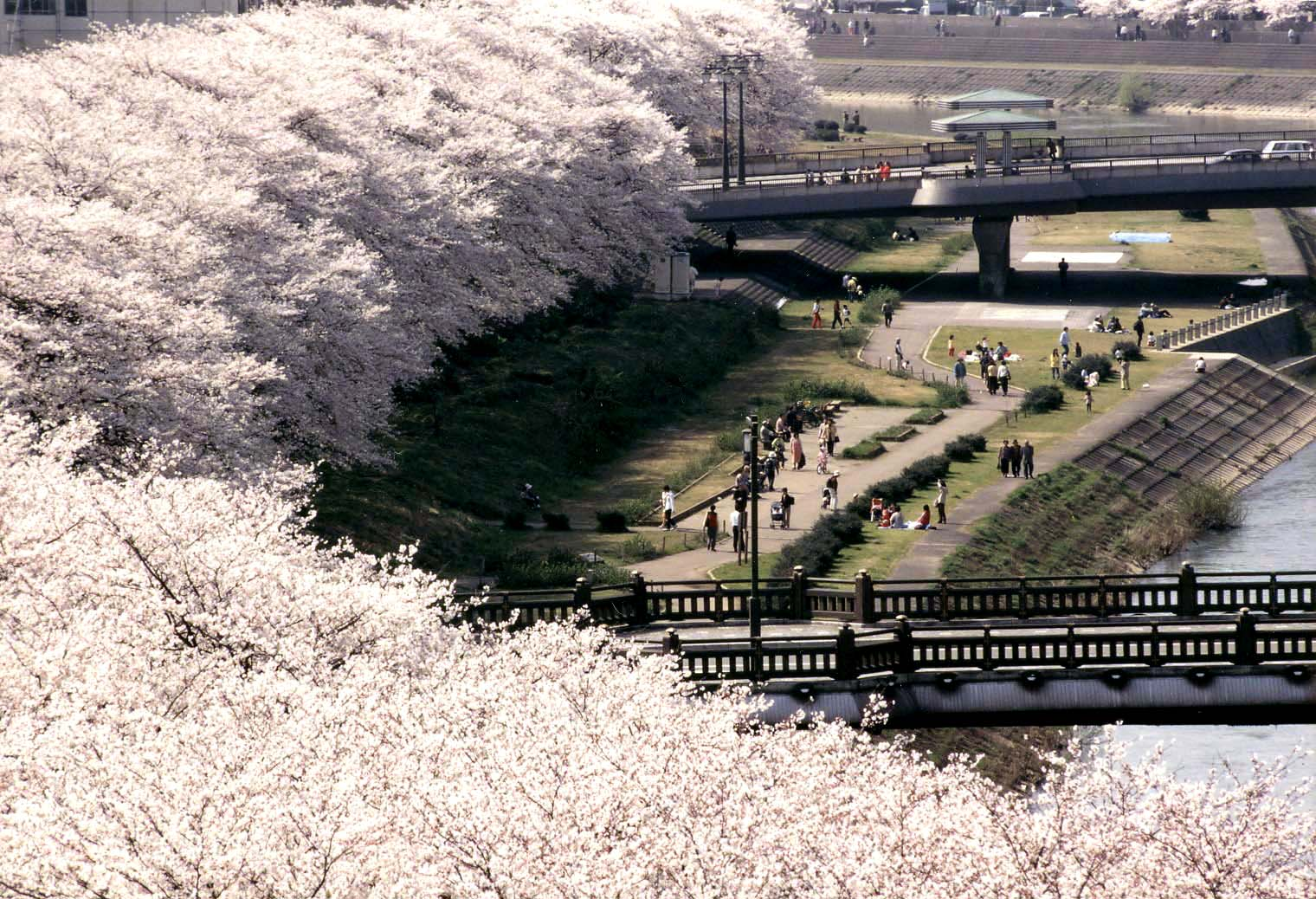
Cherry blossoms blooming in the spring in Japan

Cherry Blossom Pink

Color coordinates
- Hex triplet: #FFB7C5
- sRGB^{B} (r, g, b): (255, 183, 197)
- HSV (h, s, v): (348°, 28%, 100%)
- CIELCh_{uv} (L, C, h): (81, 45, 0°)
- Source: Maerz and Paul
- ISCC–NBS descriptor: Moderate pink
- B: Normalized to [0–255] (byte)

Cherry blossom pink
#ffb7c5

Displayed here is the color cherry blossom pink, a moderately light pink.

The first recorded use of cherry blossom pink as a color name in English was in 1867.

Cherry blossom pink is an important color in Japanese culture. In the spring, the Japanese people gather to watch the cherry blossoms bloom during the Hanami festival. This custom has spread to the United States with the institution of the Cherry Blossom Festival in Washington, D.C.

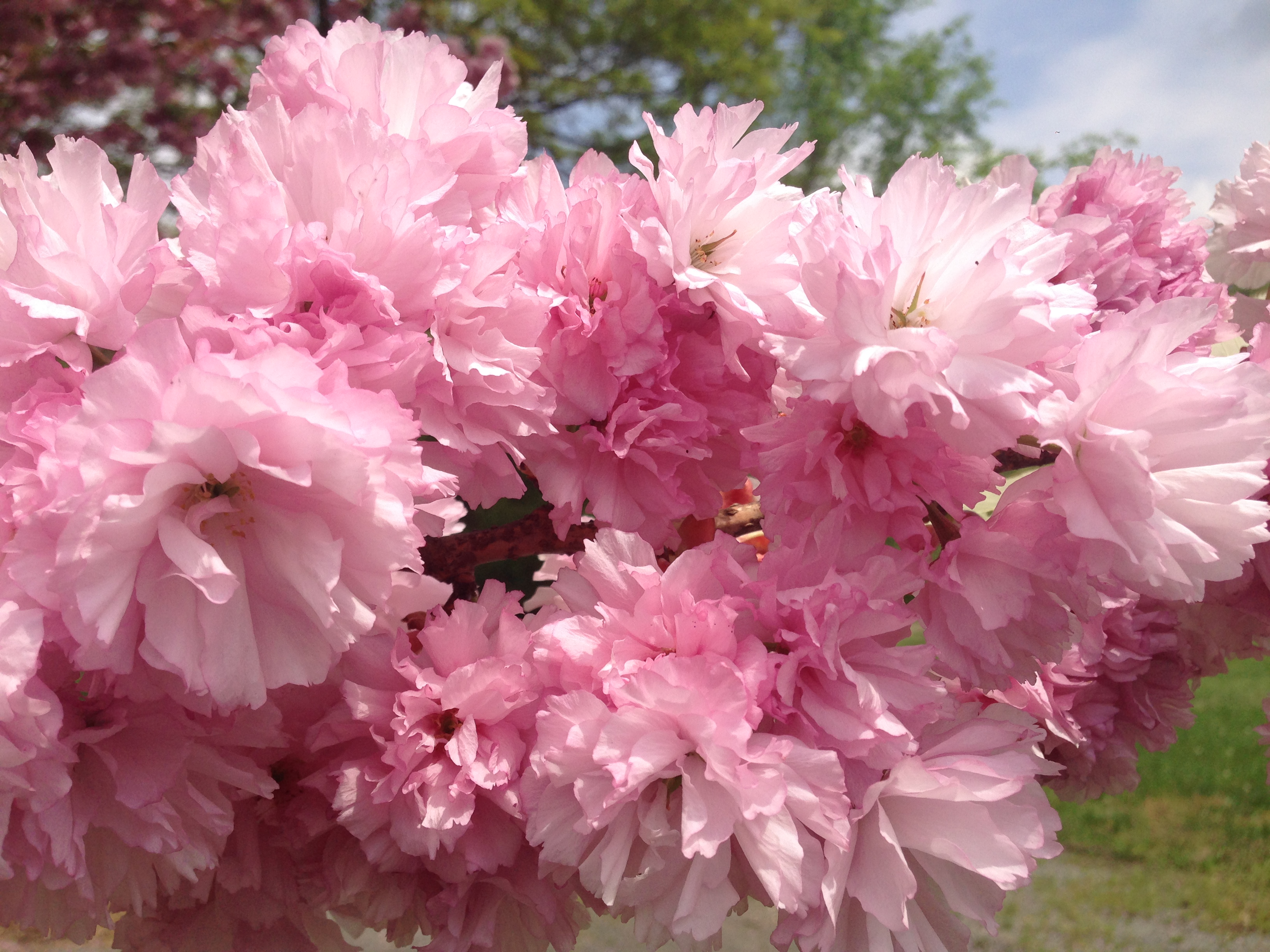
Cherry blossoms

Cherry blossom pink colored shirts are often worn to work on 15 September (a day a few days before the beginning of spring in the Southern Hemisphere) to celebrate "Cherry Blossom Day" in Brisbane, Australia.

=== Chilean Pink ===
Chilean Pink

Color coordinates
- Hex triplet: #E8C3BA
- sRGB^{B} (r, g, b): (232, 195, 186)
- HSV (h, s, v): (12°, 20%, 91%)
- CIELCh_{uv} (L, C, h): (82, 26, 26°)
- ISCC–NBS descriptor: Moderate yellowish pink
- B: Normalized to [0–255] (byte)

Chilean Pink
#e8c3ba

Chilean pink color is a shade of Chilean pink flower (Lapageria r. specie), resembling light pale red-orange, pale vermilion nuance.

=== China pink ===
China Pink

Color coordinates
- Hex triplet: #DE6FA1
- sRGB^{B} (r, g, b): (222, 111, 161)
- HSV (h, s, v): (333°, 50%, 87%)
- CIELCh_{uv} (L, C, h): (61, 71, 345°)
- Source: Plochere
- ISCC–NBS descriptor: Deep purplish pink
- B: Normalized to [0–255] (byte)

China pink
#de6fa1

Displayed here is the color China pink, a dark purplish pink.

The color name China pink first came into use in 1948.

The source of this color is the Plochere Color System, a color system formulated in 1948 that is widely used by interior designers.

=== Congo pink ===
Congo Pink

Color coordinates
- Hex triplet: #F88379
- sRGB^{B} (r, g, b): (248, 131, 121)
- HSV (h, s, v): (5°, 51%, 97%)
- CIELCh_{uv} (L, C, h): (68, 89, 16°)
- Source: ISCC-NBS
- ISCC–NBS descriptor: Deep yellowish pink
- B: Normalized to [0–255] (byte)

Congo pink
#f88379

Displayed here is the color Congo pink, a moderate yellow-toned shade of pink.

The first recorded use of Congo pink as a color name in English was in 1912.

"Congo pink" is an orangeish tone of pink.

The normalized color coordinates for Congo pink are identical to Coral pink, which was first recorded as a color name in English in 1892.

=== Coral pink ===
Coral Pink

Color coordinates
- Hex triplet: #F88379
- sRGB^{B} (r, g, b): (248, 131, 121)
- HSV (h, s, v): (5°, 51%, 97%)
- CIELCh_{uv} (L, C, h): (68, 89, 16°)
- Source: ISCC-NBS
- ISCC–NBS descriptor: Deep yellowish pink
- B: Normalized to [0–255] (byte)

Coral pink
#F88379

Displayed here is the color coral pink, a pinkish color.

The first recorded use of coral pink as a color name in English was in 1892.

The complementary color of coral pink is teal.

The normalized color coordinates for coral pink are identical to Congo pink, which was first recorded as a color name in English in 1912.

=== French pink ===
French Pink

Color coordinates
- Hex triplet: #FD6C9E
- sRGB^{B} (r, g, b): (253, 108, 158)
- HSV (h, s, v): (339°, 57%, 99%)
- CIELCh_{uv} (L, C, h): (65, 95, 354°)
- Source: Pourpre.com
- ISCC–NBS descriptor: Deep purplish pink
- B: Normalized to [0–255] (byte)

French pink
#fd6c9e

Displayed here is the color French pink, which is the tone of pink that is called pink (French: rose) in the Pourpre.com color list, a color list widely popular in France.

=== Light deep pink ===
Light Deep Pink

Color coordinates
- Hex triplet: #FF5CCD
- sRGB^{B} (r, g, b): (255, 92, 205)
- HSV (h, s, v): (318°, 64%, 100%)
- CIELCh_{uv} (L, C, h): (64, 103, 329°)
- Source: Xona.com Color List
- ISCC–NBS descriptor: Vivid reddish purple
- B: Normalized to [0–255] (byte)

Light deep pink
#ff5ccd

Displayed here is the color light deep pink, a bright purplish pink.

This is the color deep pink light on the Xona.com Color List.

=== Lusty gallant ===
Lusty gallant

Color coordinates
- Hex triplet: #FFCCCC
- sRGB^{B} (r, g, b): (255, 204, 204)
- HSV (h, s, v): (0°, 20%, 100%)
- CIELCh_{uv} (L, C, h): (86, 32, 12°)
- Source: https://www.crispedge.com/color/ffcccc/
- ISCC–NBS descriptor: Pale pink
- B: Normalized to [0–255] (byte)

Lusty gallant
#FFCCCC

Displayed here is the color Lusty gallant.

"Lusty gallant" is a light shade of pink that originated in Elizabethan England.

=== Mexican pink ===
Mexican Pink

Color coordinates
- Hex triplet: #E4007C
- sRGB^{B} (r, g, b): (228, 0, 124)
- HSV (h, s, v): (327°, 100%, 89%)
- CIELCh_{uv} (L, C, h): (49, 124, 352°)
- B: Normalized to [0–255] (byte)

Mexican pink (#e4007C)
#e4007C

Mexican pink is a color that is used in clothing such as serapes and in the craft and fine art of traditional Mexican culture.

Mexican pink became known as such through the efforts of the journalist, painter, cartoonist and fashion designer Ramón Valdiosera in the mid-1940s.

Another name for this color is Mexican rose, a play on the Spanish name rosa mexicano.

=== Millennial pink ===
Millennial pink

Color coordinates
- Hex triplet: #efc7c5
- sRGB^{B} (r, g, b): (239, 199, 197)
- HSV (h, s, v): (3°, 18%, 94%)
- CIELCh_{uv} (L, C, h): (84, 26, 15°)
- B: Normalized to [0–255] (byte)

Millennial pink
#efc7c5

Millennial pink is a soft pink that was named and became popular in the mid-2010s. Named because of its association with the social media communities of the millennial generation. The shade has also been called Tumblr Pink, after the communities of the micro-blogging site, and also Scandinavian Pink. The shade is associated with the aesthetic language of social media communities and postmodern design aesthetics of consumer goods and interior design. It has been compared to rose gold trend for consumer goods and influenced an increase in media coverage of the history of the colour pink and monochromatic trends. The term "Millennial Pink" was mentioned 32,000 times online in 2017.

The popularity of the shade coincided with a shift in how gender was communicated with an embrace of "the feminine", an increase in visibility of LGBTQ+ people, and an rejections of gender norms. The media attributed the popularity of the colour to Wes Anderson's 2014 film The Grand Budapest Hotel and the Pantone colors of the year in 2016: rose quartz.

=== Mimi Pink ===
Mimi Pink

Color coordinates
- Hex triplet: #FFDAE9
- sRGB^{B} (r, g, b): (255, 218, 233)
- HSV (h, s, v): (336°, 15%, 100%)
- CIELCh_{uv} (L, C, h): (90, 22, 342°)
- Source: colorhexa.com
- ISCC–NBS descriptor: Pale purplish pink
- B: Normalized to [0–255] (byte)

Mimi Pink (#ffdae9)
#ffdae9

Displayed here is the color Mimi Pink, a pale shade of purplish pink.

=== Misty rose ===
Misty Rose

Color coordinates
- Hex triplet: #FFE4E1
- sRGB^{B} (r, g, b): (255, 228, 225)
- HSV (h, s, v): (6°, 12%, 100%)
- CIELCh_{uv} (L, C, h): (93, 17, 19°)
- Source: X11
- ISCC–NBS descriptor: Pinkish white
- B: Normalized to [0–255] (byte)

Misty rose
#ffe4e1

Misty rose is a pale shade of pink. It is also a web color.

=== Mona Lisa ===
Mona Lisa

Color coordinates
- Hex triplet: #FF948E
- sRGB^{B} (r, g, b): (255, 148, 142)
- HSV (h, s, v): (3°, 44%, 100%)
- CIELCh_{uv} (L, C, h): (72, 78, 15°)
- ISCC–NBS descriptor: Vivid pink
- B: Normalized to [0–255] (byte)

Displayed here is the color mona lisa, a vivid pink. It is named after the Mona Lisa.

=== Mountbatten pink ===
Mountbatten Pink

Color coordinates
- Hex triplet: #997A8D
- sRGB^{B} (r, g, b): (153, 122, 141)
- HSV (h, s, v): (323°, 20%, 60%)
- CIELCh_{uv} (L, C, h): (55, 20, 328°)
- B: Normalized to [0–255] (byte)

Mountbatten pink (#997A8D)
#997A8D

Mountbatten pink, also called Plymouth pink, is a naval camouflage color, a grayish tone of mauve, invented by Louis Mountbatten of the British Royal Navy in autumn 1940 during World War II.

=== New York pink ===
New York Pink

Color coordinates
- Hex triplet: #D7837F
- sRGB^{B} (r, g, b): (215, 131, 127)
- HSV (h, s, v): (3°, 41%, 84%)
- CIELCh_{uv} (L, C, h): (64, 60, 15°)
- Source: Xona.com Color List
- ISCC–NBS descriptor: Deep yellowish pink
- B: Normalized to [0–255] (byte)

New York pink
#d7837f

Displayed here is the color New York pink, a dark, desaturated yellow-toned shade of pink.

The color name New York pink for this dark tone of pink has been in use since 2001, when it was promulgated as one of the colors on the Xona.com Color List.

=== Pale pink ===
Pale Pink

Color coordinates
- Hex triplet: #F9CCCA
- sRGB^{B} (r, g, b): (249, 204, 202)
- HSV (h, s, v): (3°, 19%, 98%)
- CIELCh_{uv} (L, C, h): (86, 29, 15°)
- Source: ISCC-NBS
- ISCC–NBS descriptor: Light yellowish pink
- B: Normalized to [0–255] (byte)

Pale pink (#f9ccca)
#f9ccca

Displayed here is the color pale pink, a light, desaturated shade of pink.

=== Persian pink ===
Persian Pink

Color coordinates
- Hex triplet: #F77FBE
- sRGB^{B} (r, g, b): (247, 127, 190)
- HSV (h, s, v): (328°, 49%, 97%)
- CIELCh_{uv} (L, C, h): (69, 76, 339°)
- Source: Maerz and Paul
- ISCC–NBS descriptor: Deep purplish pink
- B: Normalized to [0–255] (byte)

Persian pink
#f77fbe

Displayed here is the color Persian pink, a bright, purplish pink.

The first recorded use of Persian pink as a color name in English was in 1923.

=== Pink (RYB) ===
Pink (RYB)

Color coordinates
- Hex triplet: #FF8080
- sRGB^{B} (r, g, b): (255, 128, 128)
- HSV (h, s, v): (0°, 50%, 100%)
- CIELCh_{uv} (L, C, h): (68, 94, 12°)
- Source: RYB color system
- B: Normalized to [0–255] (byte)

Displayed here is the color that is called "pink" in the RYB color model. It is a mixture of red and white.

=== Pink lace ===
Pink Lace

Color coordinates
- Hex triplet: #FFDDF4
- sRGB^{B} (r, g, b): (255, 221, 244)
- HSV (h, s, v): (319°, 13%, 100%)
- CIELCh_{uv} (L, C, h): (91, 23, 324°)
- Source: Xona.com Color List
- ISCC–NBS descriptor: Pale purplish pink
- B: Normalized to [0–255] (byte)

Pink lace (#ffddf4)
#ffddf4

Displayed here is the color pink lace, a pale purplish pink.

The color name pink lace for this pale tone of rose pink has been in use since 2001, when it was promulgated as one of the colors on the Xona.com Color List.

This color is suggestive of the color of some women's lingerie.

=== Queen pink ===
Queen Pink

Color coordinates
- Hex triplet: #E8CCD7
- sRGB^{B} (r, g, b): (232, 204, 215)
- HSV (h, s, v): (336°, 12%, 91%)
- CIELCh_{uv} (L, C, h): (85, 16, 343°)
- Source: Plochere
- ISCC–NBS descriptor: Pale pink
- B: Normalized to [0–255] (byte)

Queen pink
#e8ccd7

Displayed here is the color queen pink, a pale shade of pink.

The color name queen pink first came into use in 1948.

The source of this color is the Plochere Color System, a color system formulated in 1948 that is widely used by interior designers.

=== Rose Pompadour ===
Rose Pompadour

Color coordinates
- Hex triplet: #ED7A9B
- sRGB^{B} (r, g, b): (237, 122, 155)
- HSV (h, s, v): (343°, 49%, 93%)
- CIELCh_{uv} (L, C, h): (65, 75, 356°)
- Source: Color-sample.com
- ISCC–NBS descriptor: Deep purplish pink
- B: Normalized to [0–255] (byte)

Rose Pompadour
#ed7a9b

The term Rose Pompadour can apply to either a purplish-pink, or a reddish-purple tone. The first of these, a desaturated purplish-pink is displayed here Rose Pompadour.

This color was designed by Sèvres in 18th century France, reputedly for Madame de Pompadour.

However, in the UK and Ireland, the term Rose Pompadour typically applies to a reddish-purple equivalent to claret or maroon.

=== Rose pink ===
Rose Pink

Color coordinates
- Hex triplet: #FF66CC
- sRGB^{B} (r, g, b): (255, 102, 204)
- HSV (h, s, v): (320°, 60%, 100%)
- CIELCh_{uv} (L, C, h): (66, 97, 331°)
- Source: WSC
- ISCC–NBS descriptor: Vivid reddish purple
- B: Normalized to [0–255] (byte)

Rose pink
#ff66cc

Displayed here is the color Rose pink, a bright, purplish pink.

The first recorded use of rose pink as a color name in English was in 1761.

=== Shocking pink ===
Shocking Pink

Color coordinates
- Hex triplet: #FC0FC0
- sRGB^{B} (r, g, b): (252, 15, 192)
- HSV (h, s, v): (315°, 94%, 99%)
- CIELCh_{uv} (L, C, h): (57, 124, 331°)
- Source: wornjournal.com
- ISCC–NBS descriptor: Vivid reddish purple
- B: Normalized to [0–255] (byte)

Shocking pink
#fc0fc0

Shocking pink is bold and intense. It takes its name from the tone of pink used in the lettering on the box of the perfume called Shocking, designed by Leonor Fini for the Surrealist fashion designer Elsa Schiaparelli in 1937. The color shown at right matches the color of the lettering on the original box. This in turn was inspired by the Tête de Belier (Ram's Head), a 17.27 ct pink diamond from Cartier owned by heiress Daisy Fellowes, who was one of Schiaparelli's best clients.

Shocking pink kept its name in British English, whereas in North America "This intense magenta was called shocking pink in the 1930s, hot pink in the 1950s, and kinky pink in the 1960s...[it] has appeared in the vanguard of more than one youth revolution...to some it sings, to others it screams". This color is now again called "shocking pink" to distinguish it from the web color hot pink (shown above).

NHRA drag racer Shirley Muldowney was famous for driving a shocking pink dragster.

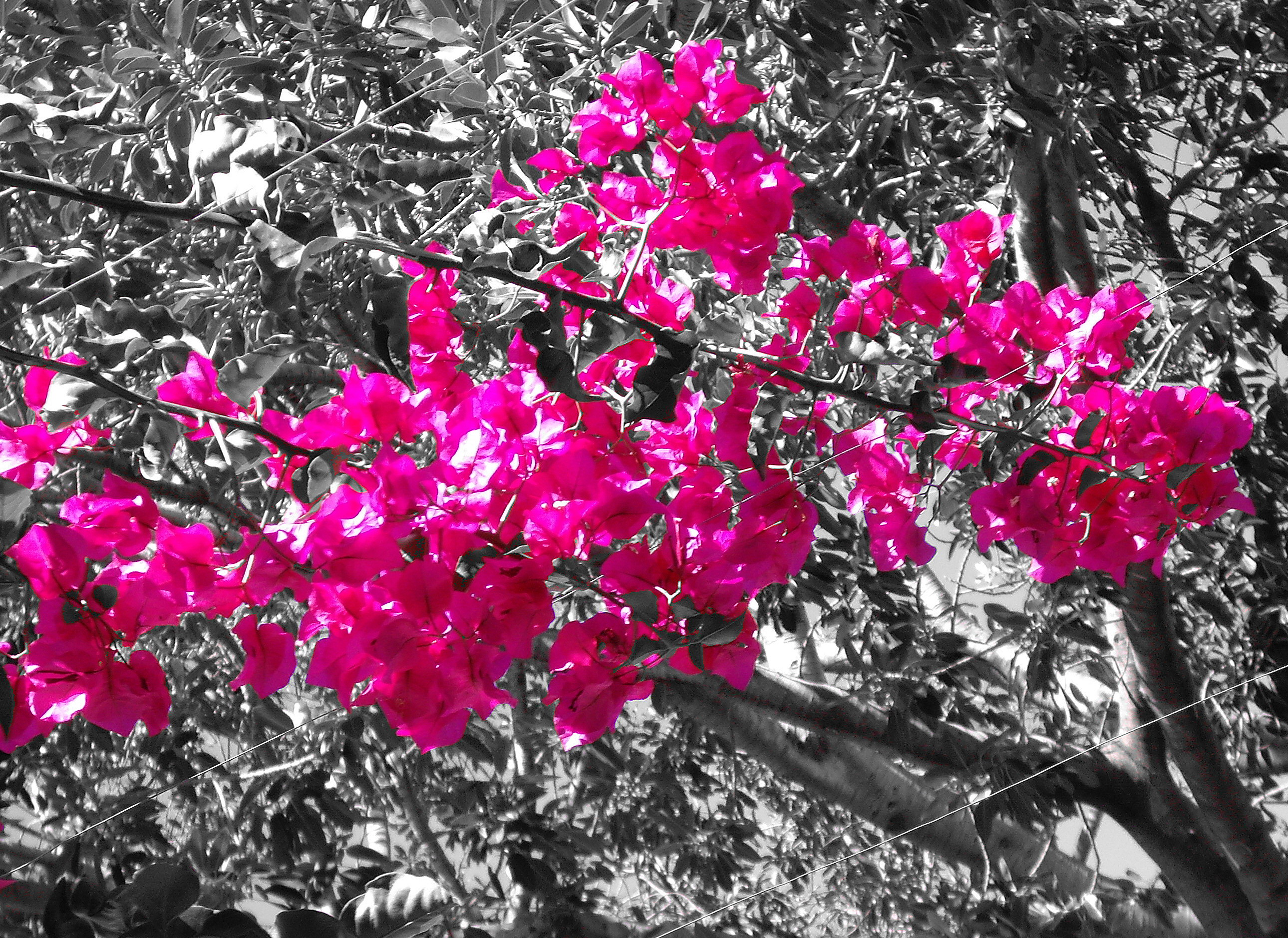
A bougainvillea with shocking pink flowers

On its way into the German language, shocking pink lost the "shocking" and is called only "Pink"; the color that is called "pink" in English is called "rosa" in German as it is in most other Indo-European languages. A similar situation happens in Portuguese, but its nomenclature arrives intact, becoming "rosa-choque" ("shocking pink"). Brazilians also call all darker and hot tones of pink "rosa-pink".

=== Silver pink ===
Silver Pink

Color coordinates
- Hex triplet: #C4AEAD
- sRGB^{B} (r, g, b): (196, 174, 173)
- HSV (h, s, v): (3°, 12%, 77%)
- CIELCh_{uv} (L, C, h): (73, 14, 15°)
- Source: Plochere
- ISCC–NBS descriptor: Grayish yellowish pink
- B: Normalized to [0–255] (byte)

Silver pink
#c4aead

Displayed here is the color silver pink, a grayish shade of pink.

The color name silver pink first came into use in 1948.

The source of this color is the Plochere Color System, a color system formulated in 1948 that is widely used by interior designers.

=== Solid pink ===
Solid Pink

Color coordinates
- Hex triplet: #893843
- sRGB^{B} (r, g, b): (137, 56, 67)
- HSV (h, s, v): (352°, 59%, 54%)
- CIELCh_{uv} (L, C, h): (35, 56, 6°)
- Source: Xona.com Color List
- ISCC–NBS descriptor: Dark red
- B: Normalized to [0–255] (byte)

Solid pink
#893843

Solid pink (2.5 Gamma Corrected)
#c78b95

Displayed here is the color solid pink, a dark reddish pink.

The color name solid pink for this extremely dark tone of pink has been in use since 2001, when it was promulgated as one of the colors on the Xona.com Color List.

=== Spanish pink ===
Pink (G&S)

Color coordinates
- Hex triplet: #F7BFBE
- sRGB^{B} (r, g, b): (247, 191, 190)
- HSV (h, s, v): (1°, 23%, 97%)
- CIELCh_{uv} (L, C, h): (82, 36, 13°)
- Source: Gallego and Sanz
- ISCC–NBS descriptor: Moderate yellowish pink
- B: Normalized to [0–255] (byte)

Spanish pink (#f7bfbe)
#f7bfbe

Spanish pink is the color that is called Rosa (the Spanish word for "pink") in the Guía de coloraciones (Guide to colorations) by Rosa Gallego and Juan Carlos Sanz, a color dictionary published in 2005 that is widely popular in the Hispanophone realm.

=== Tango pink ===
Tango Pink

Color coordinates
- Hex triplet: #E4717A
- sRGB^{B} (r, g, b): (228, 113, 122)
- HSV (h, s, v): (355°, 50%, 89%)
- CIELCh_{uv} (L, C, h): (61, 82, 9°)
- Source: Plochere
- ISCC–NBS descriptor: Deep pink
- B: Normalized to [0–255] (byte)

Tango pink
#e4717a

Displayed here is the color tango pink, a moderate reddish pink.

Another name for this color is tango.

The first recorded use of tango pink as a color name in English was in 1925.

The source of this color is the Plochere Color System, a color system formulated in 1948 that is widely used by interior designers.

== Pantone colors ==
=== Champagne pink ===
Champagne Pink

Color coordinates
- Hex triplet: #F1DDCF
- sRGB^{B} (r, g, b): (241, 221, 207)
- HSV (h, s, v): (25°, 14%, 95%)
- CIELCh_{uv} (L, C, h): (89, 18, 46°)
- Source: Pantone TPX
- ISCC–NBS descriptor: Yellowish white
- B: Normalized to [0–255] (byte)

Champagne pink (#f1ddcf)
#f1ddcf

Displayed here is the color champagne pink, a strongly yellow-hued shade of pink.

The source of this color is the "Pantone Textile Paper eXtended (TPX)" color list, color #12-1107 TPX—Champagne Pink.

=== Fairy Tale ===
Fairy Tale

Color coordinates
- Hex triplet: #F2C1D1
- sRGB^{B} (r, g, b): (242, 193, 209)
- HSV (h, s, v): (340°, 20%, 95%)
- CIELCh_{uv} (L, C, h): (83, 29, 349°)
- Source: Pantone TCX
- ISCC–NBS descriptor: Pale purplish pink
- B: Normalized to [0–255] (byte)

Fairy tale
#f2c1d1

Displayed here is the color Fairy Tale, a pale and soft purplish pink color resembling typical fairy outfits in fiction. It is similar to orchid pink but slightly paler and more purple-toned.

The source of this color is the "Pantone Textile Cotton eXtended (TCX)" color list, color #13-2802 TCX—Fairy Tale.

=== Fandango pink ===
Fandango Pink

Color coordinates
- Hex triplet: #DE5285
- sRGB^{B} (r, g, b): (222, 82, 133)
- HSV (h, s, v): (338°, 63%, 87%)
- CIELCh_{uv} (L, C, h): (55, 92, 354°)
- Source: Pantone TPX
- ISCC–NBS descriptor: Vivid purplish red
- B: Normalized to [0–255] (byte)

Fandango pink
#de5285

Displayed here is the color fandango pink, a vivid pink.

The source of this color is the "Pantone Textile Paper eXtended (TPX)" color list, color #17-2033 TPX—Fandango Pink.

=== Orchid pink ===
Orchid Pink

Color coordinates
- Hex triplet: #F2BDCD
- sRGB^{B} (r, g, b): (242, 189, 205)
- HSV (h, s, v): (342°, 22%, 95%)
- CIELCh_{uv} (L, C, h): (82, 32, 351°)
- Source: Pantone TPX
- ISCC–NBS descriptor: Pale purplish pink
- B: Normalized to [0–255] (byte)

Orchid pink
#f2bdcd

Displayed here is the color orchid pink, a pale and soft purplish pink color.

The source of this color is the "Pantone Textile Paper eXtended (TPX)" color list, color #13-2010 TPX—Orchid Pink.

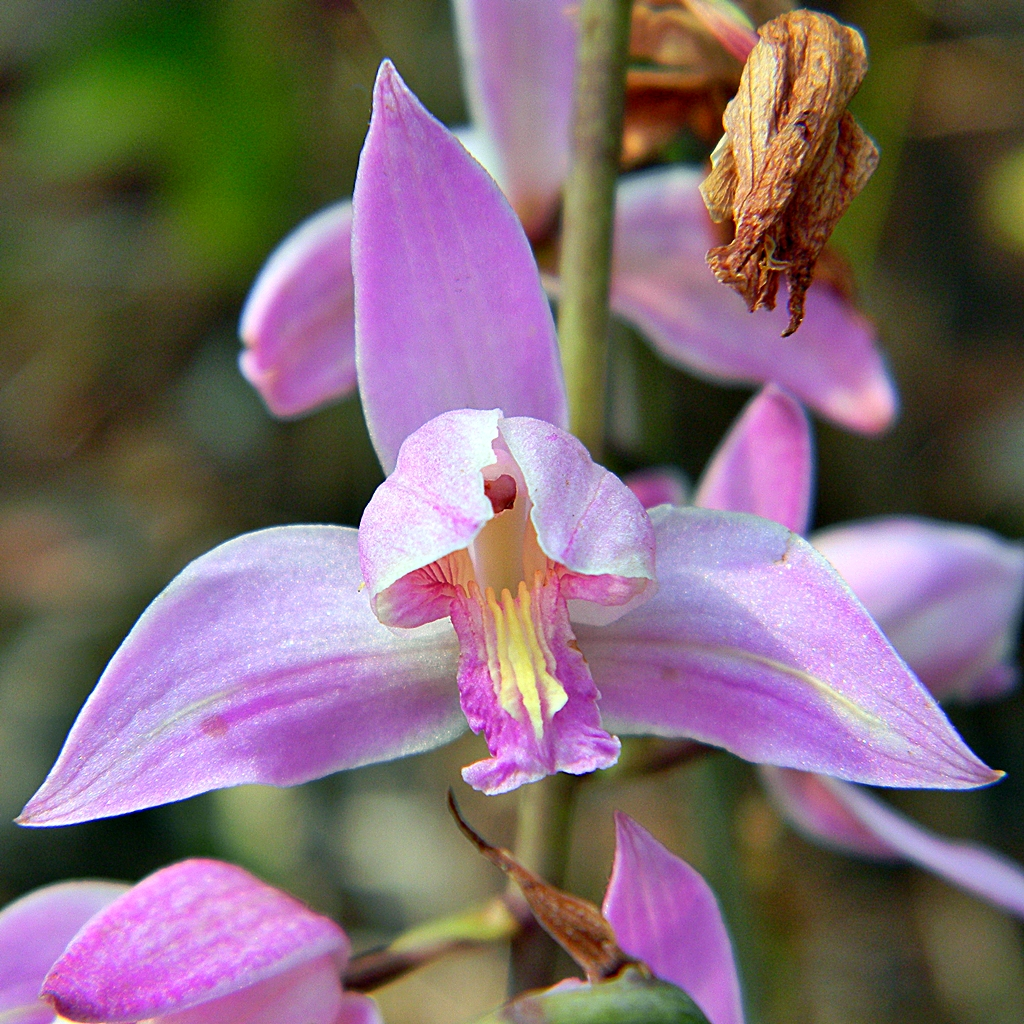
Wild pink orchid

=== Pale Dogwood ===
Pale Dogwood

Color coordinates
- Hex triplet: #EDCDC2
- sRGB^{B} (r, g, b): (237, 205, 194)
- HSV (h, s, v): (15°, 18%, 93%)
- CIELCh_{uv} (L, C, h): (85, 24, 31°)
- Source: Pantone TCX
- ISCC–NBS descriptor: Pale yellowish pink
- B: Normalized to [0–255] (byte)

Pale Dogwood
#EDCDC2

Pale Dogwood is a beige-tinted shade of pink.

The source of this color is the "Pantone Textile Cotton eXtended (TCX)" color list, color #13-1404 TCX—Pale Dogwood.

=== Paradise pink ===
Paradise Pink

Color coordinates
- Hex triplet: #E63E62
- sRGB^{B} (r, g, b): (230, 62, 98)
- HSV (h, s, v): (347°, 73%, 90%)
- CIELCh_{uv} (L, C, h): (53, 119, 5°)
- Source: Pantone TPX
- ISCC–NBS descriptor: Vivid red
- B: Normalized to [0–255] (byte)

Paradise pink
#e63e62

Displayed here is the color paradise pink, a bright, reddish pink.

The source of this color is the "Pantone Textile Paper eXtended (TPX)" color list, color #17-1755 TPX—Paradise Pink.

=== Pink (Pantone) ===
Pink (Pantone)

Color coordinates
- Hex triplet: #D74894
- sRGB^{B} (r, g, b): (215, 72, 148)
- HSV (h, s, v): (328°, 67%, 84%)
- CIELCh_{uv} (L, C, h): (53, 89, 342°)
- Source: Pantone TPX
- ISCC–NBS descriptor: Vivid purplish red
- B: Normalized to [0–255] (byte)

Pink (Pantone)
#d74894

Displayed here is the color called pink in Pantone.

In Pantone, this color is designated as Pink U.

The source of this color is the "Pantone Textile Paper eXtended (TPX)" color list, color #U—Pink.

=== Pink lavender ===
Pink Lavender

Color coordinates
- Hex triplet: #DBB2D1
- sRGB^{B} (r, g, b): (219, 178, 209)
- HSV (h, s, v): (315°, 19%, 86%)
- CIELCh_{uv} (L, C, h): (77, 29, 319°)
- Source: Pantone TPX
- ISCC–NBS descriptor: Grayish purplish pink
- B: Normalized to [0–255] (byte)

Pink Lavender
#dbb2d1

Displayed here is the color pink lavender, a light, strongly purplish shade of pink.

The source of this color is the "Pantone Textile Paper eXtended (TPX)" color list, color #14-3207 TPX—Pink Lavender.

=== Super pink ===
Super Pink

Color coordinates
- Hex triplet: #CF6BA9
- sRGB^{B} (r, g, b): (207, 107, 169)
- HSV (h, s, v): (323°, 48%, 81%)
- CIELCh_{uv} (L, C, h): (59, 65, 332°)
- Source: Pantone TPX
- ISCC–NBS descriptor: Strong reddish purple
- B: Normalized to [0–255] (byte)

Super pink
#cf6ba9

Displayed here is the color super pink, a purple-toned shade of pink.

The source of this color is the "Pantone Textile Paper eXtended (TPX)" color list, color #17-2625 TPX—Super Pink.

== Crayola colors ==
=== Brink pink ===
Brink Pink

Color coordinates
- Hex triplet: #FB607F
- sRGB^{B} (r, g, b): (251, 96, 127)
- HSV (h, s, v): (348°, 62%, 98%)
- CIELCh_{uv} (L, C, h): (62, 109, 4°)
- Source: Crayola
- ISCC–NBS descriptor: Vivid red
- B: Normalized to [0–255] (byte)

Brink pink
#fb607f

The color brink pink was formulated by Crayola in 1998. Since 2005 it has been called pink sherbert.

=== Cotton candy ===
Cotton Candy

Color coordinates
- Hex triplet: #FFB7D5
- sRGB^{B} (r, g, b): (255, 183, 213)
- HSV (h, s, v): (335°, 28%, 100%)
- CIELCh_{uv} (L, C, h): (82, 44, 343°)
- Source: Crayola
- ISCC–NBS descriptor: Light purplish pink
- B: Normalized to [0–255] (byte)

Cotton candy
#FFB7D5

Displayed here is the color cotton candy, a light purplish pink. The color cotton candy was formulated by Crayola in 1998.

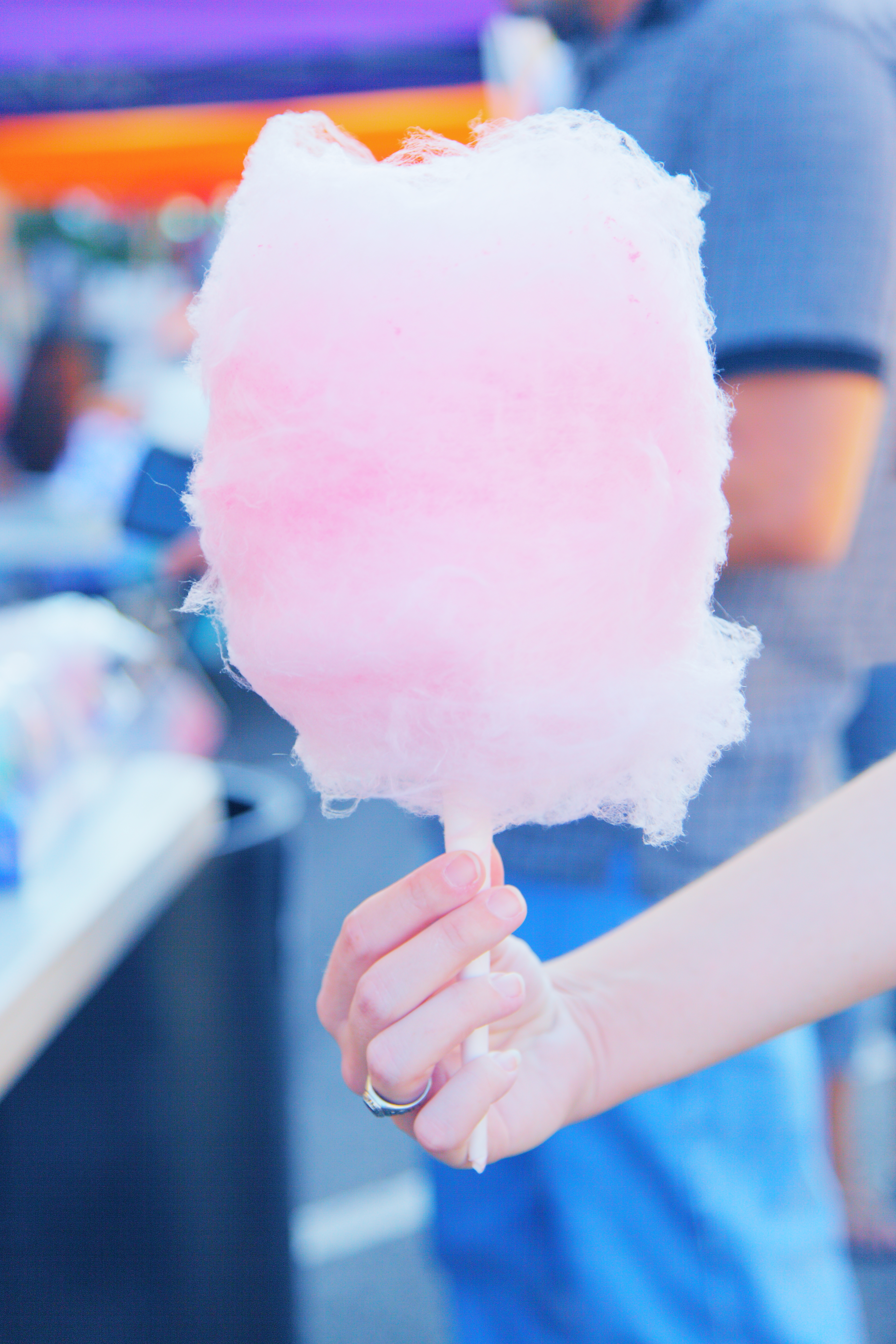
A tuft of cotton candy

=== Carnation pink ===
Carnation Pink

Color coordinates
- Hex triplet: #FFA6C9
- sRGB^{B} (r, g, b): (255, 166, 201)
- HSV (h, s, v): (336°, 35%, 100%)
- CIELCh_{uv} (L, C, h): (78, 55, 346°)
- Source: List of Crayola crayon colors
- ISCC–NBS descriptor: Moderate purplish pink
- B: Normalized to [0–255] (byte)

Carnation pink
#ffa6c9

Displayed here is the color carnation pink. Carnation pink is a color that resembles the flower color of a carnation plant. The color as displayed here was formulated by Crayola in 1903, and appears in Crayola's boxes of 16, 24, 32, 48, 64 and 96 colors.

The first recorded use of carnation as a color name in English was in 1535.

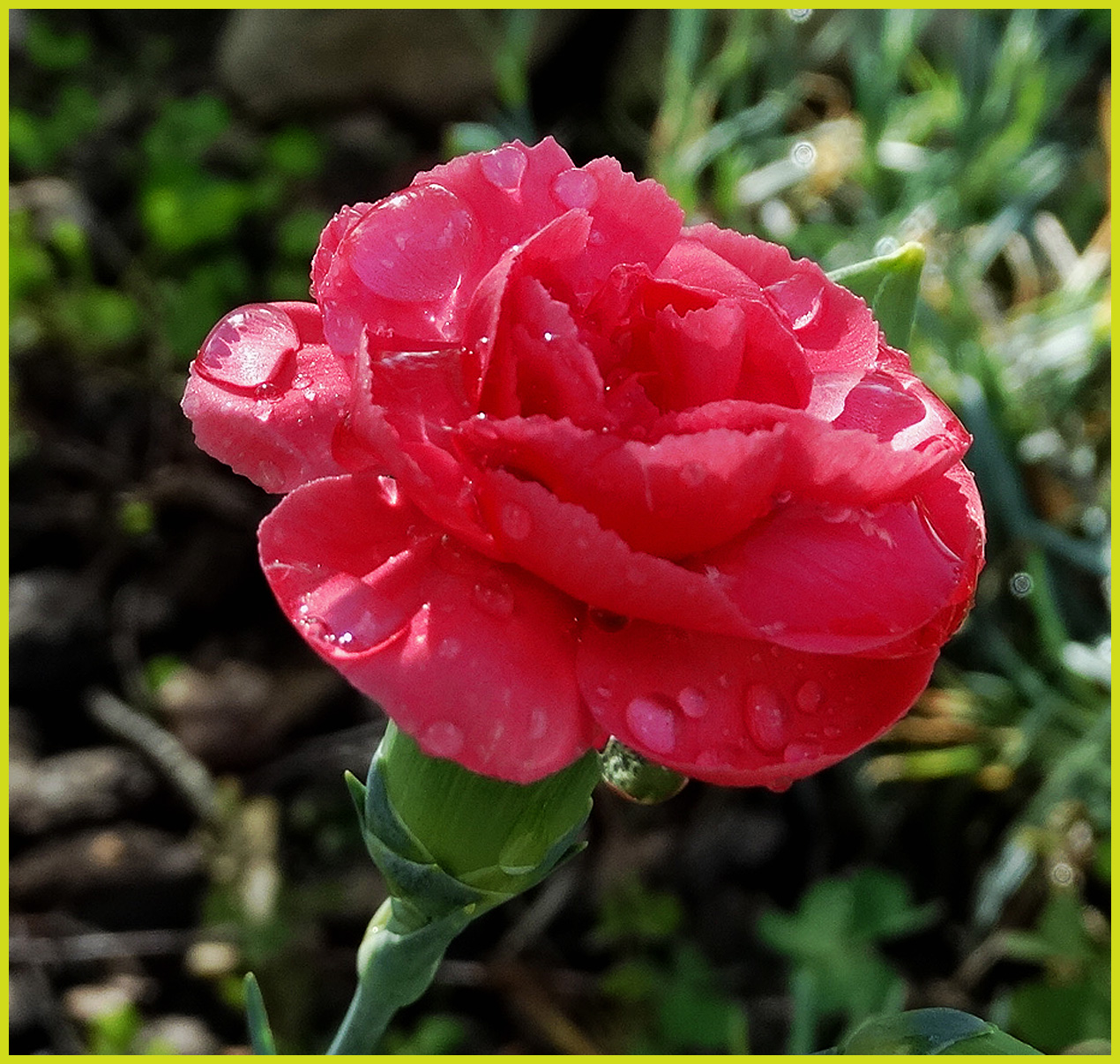
A pink carnation flower

=== Piggy pink ===
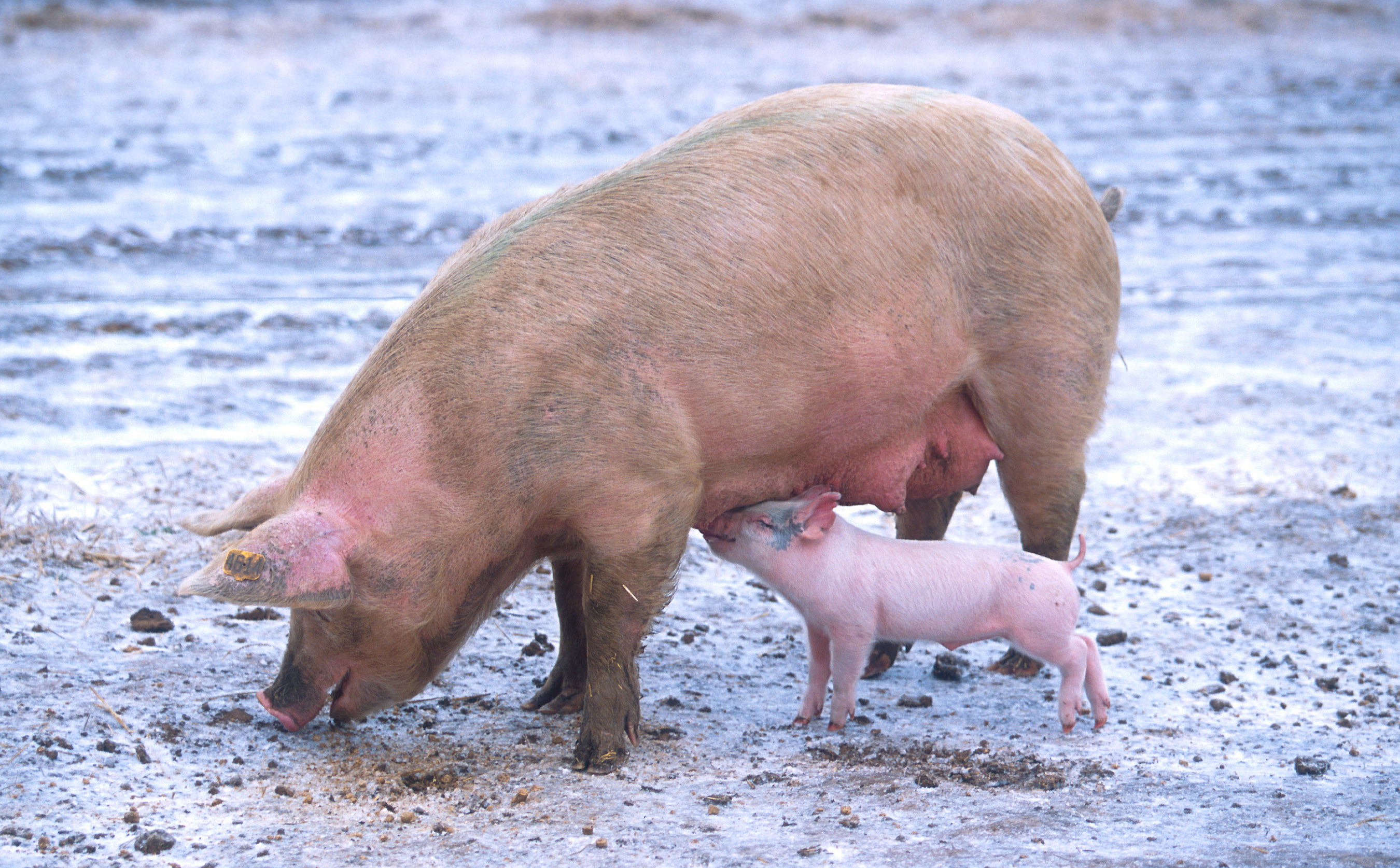
Many pigs are colored pink

Piggy Pink

Color coordinates
- Hex triplet: #FDDDE6
- sRGB^{B} (r, g, b): (253, 221, 230)
- HSV (h, s, v): (343°, 13%, 99%)
- CIELCh_{uv} (L, C, h): (91, 18, 351°)
- Source: Crayola
- ISCC–NBS descriptor: Pale pink
- B: Normalized to [0–255] (byte)

Piggy pink (#fddde6)
#fddde6

Displayed here is the color piggy pink.

The color piggy pink is a representation of the color of a pink pig.

The color piggy pink was formulated by Crayola in 1998. The color was originally called pig pink, but later the name was changed to "piggy pink".

=== Lavender pink ===
Lavender Pink
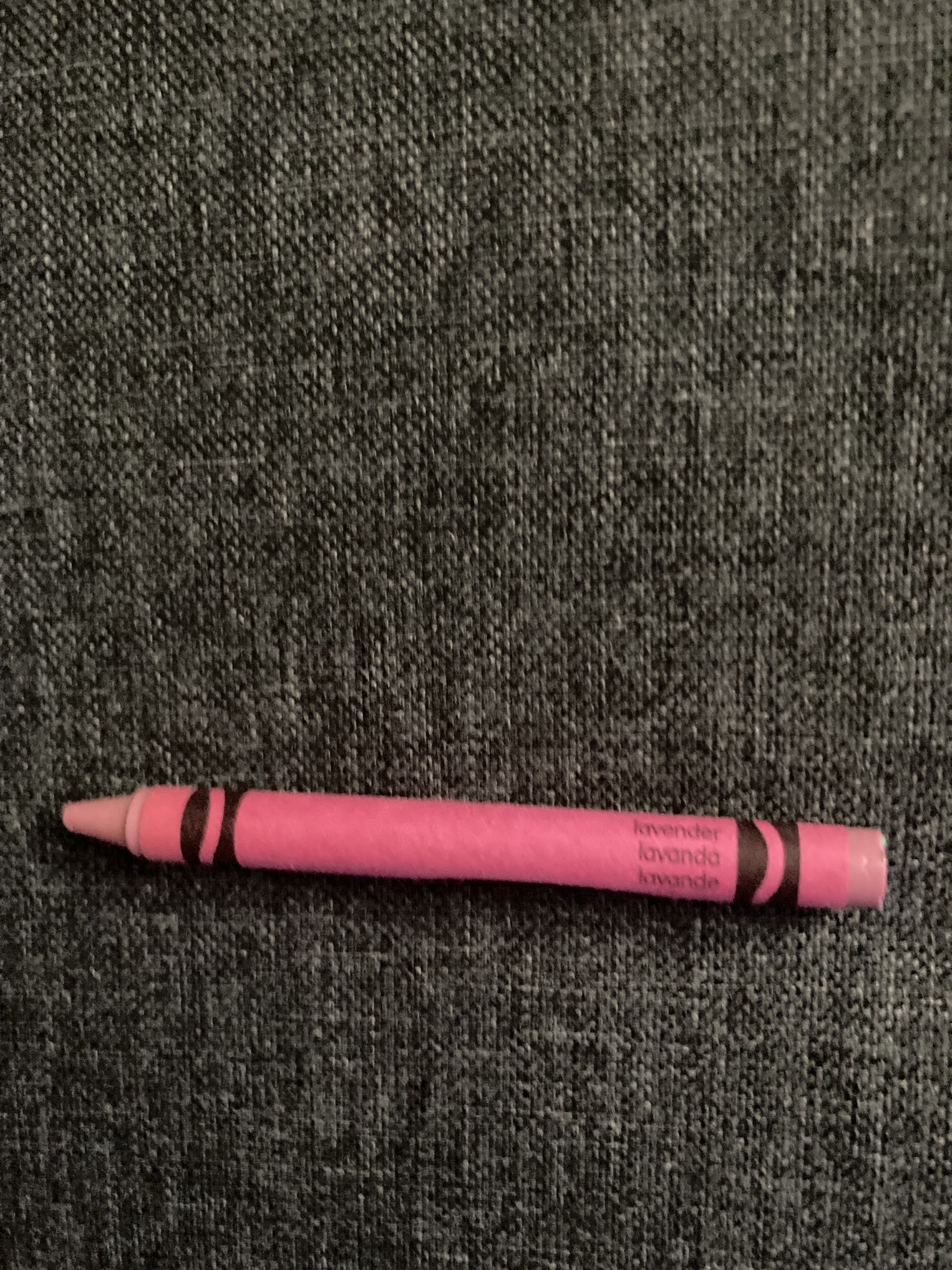
- A lavender Crayola crayon

Color coordinates
- Hex triplet: #FBAED2
- sRGB^{B} (r, g, b): (251, 174, 210)
- HSV (h, s, v): (332°, 31%, 98%)
- CIELCh_{uv} (L, C, h): (79, 48, 340°)
- Source: Crayola
- ISCC–NBS descriptor: Light purplish pink
- B: Normalized to [0–255] (byte)

Lavender pink
#fbaed2

Displayed here is the color Lavender pink, a moderately light purplish pink.

This pinkish tone of lavender, displayed at right, is the color designated as lavender in the list of Crayola crayon colors.

=== Steel pink ===
Steel Pink

Color coordinates
- Hex triplet: #CC33CC
- sRGB^{B} (r, g, b): (204, 51, 204)
- HSV (h, s, v): (300°, 75%, 80%)
- CIELCh_{uv} (L, C, h): (51, 102, 308°)
- Source: Crayola
- ISCC–NBS descriptor: Vivid purple
- B: Normalized to [0–255] (byte)

Steel pink
#cc33cc

Displayed here is the color steel pink, a strongly purple-toned shade of pink.

The color steel pink was introduced by Crayola in January 2011, when the Ultra Hot and Super Cool set of Crayola colored pencils was fully introduced.

"Steel pink" is a deep tone of magenta.

=== Tickle me pink ===
Tickle Me Pink

Color coordinates
- Hex triplet: #FC89AC
- sRGB^{B} (r, g, b): (252, 137, 172)
- HSV (h, s, v): (342°, 46%, 99%)
- CIELCh_{uv} (L, C, h): (71, 74, 355°)
- Source: Crayola
- ISCC–NBS descriptor: Strong purplish pink
- B: Normalized to [0–255] (byte)

Tickle Me Pink
#fc89ac

The tickle me pink is a bright shade of pink first formulated by Crayola in 1993. The name was created by 12-year-old Sam Marcus, when he won a Crayola competition.

=== Ultra pink ===
Ultra Pink

Color coordinates
- Hex triplet: #FF6FFF
- sRGB^{B} (r, g, b): (255, 111, 255)
- HSV (h, s, v): (300°, 56%, 100%)
- CIELCh_{uv} (L, C, h): (69, 108, 308°)
- Source: Crayola
- ISCC–NBS descriptor: Vivid purple
- B: Normalized to [0–255] (byte)

Ultra pink
#ff6fff

Ultra pink is a Crayola crayon color formulated in 1972. In 1990, the name was changed in error to shocking pink; however, properly speaking, the name shocking pink should be reserved for only the original shocking pink formulated by Elsa Schiaparelli in 1937 (shown above).

== See also ==
- Lists of colors
