= Carmine (color) =

Very slightly purplish, deep red

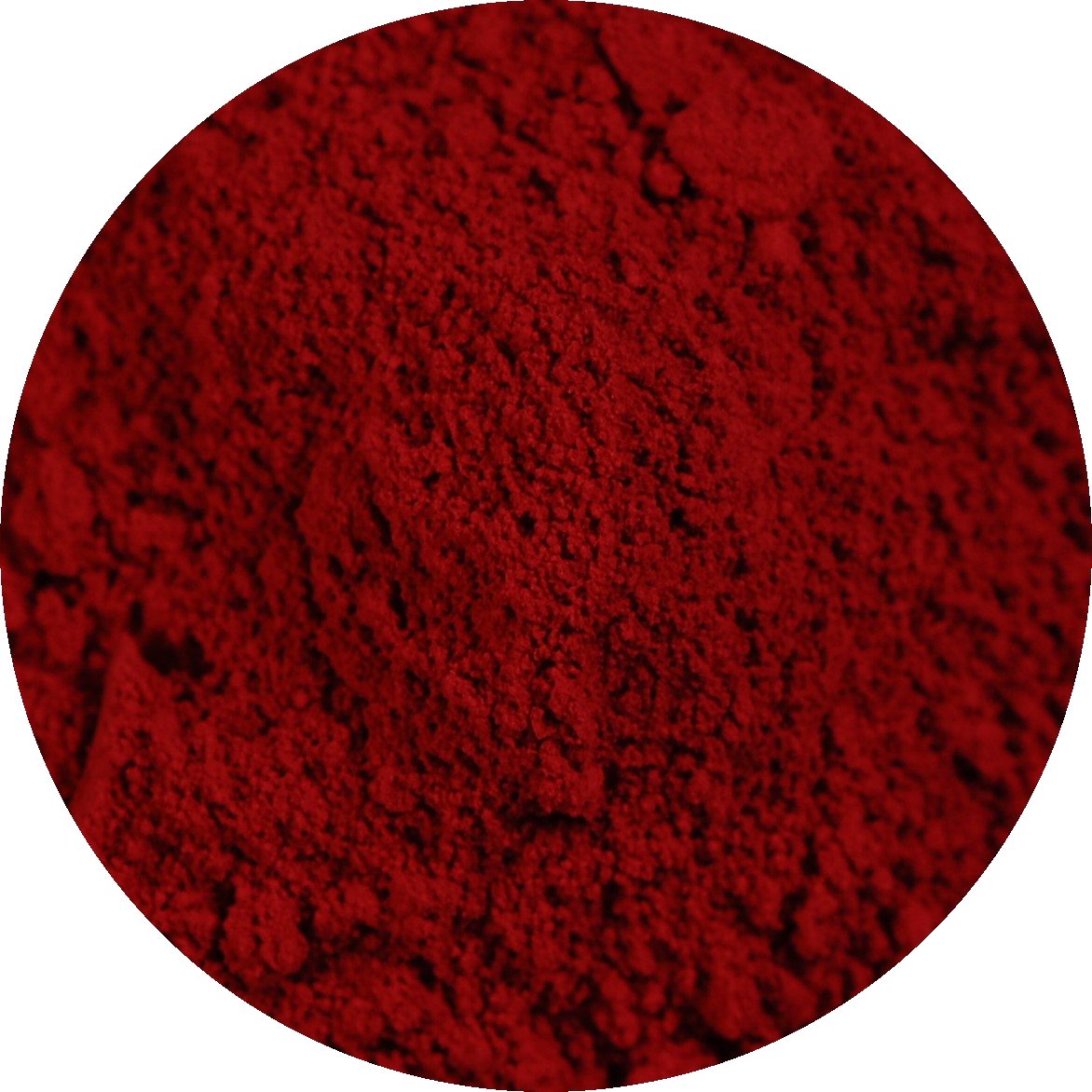
- Powdered carmine pigment

Color coordinates
- Hex triplet: #960018
- sRGB^{B} (r, g, b): (150, 0, 24)
- HSV (h, s, v): (350°, 100%, 59%)
- CIELCh_{uv} (L, C, h): (31, 99, 10°)
- Source: Color Register
- ISCC–NBS descriptor: Vivid red
- B: Normalized to [0–255] (byte)

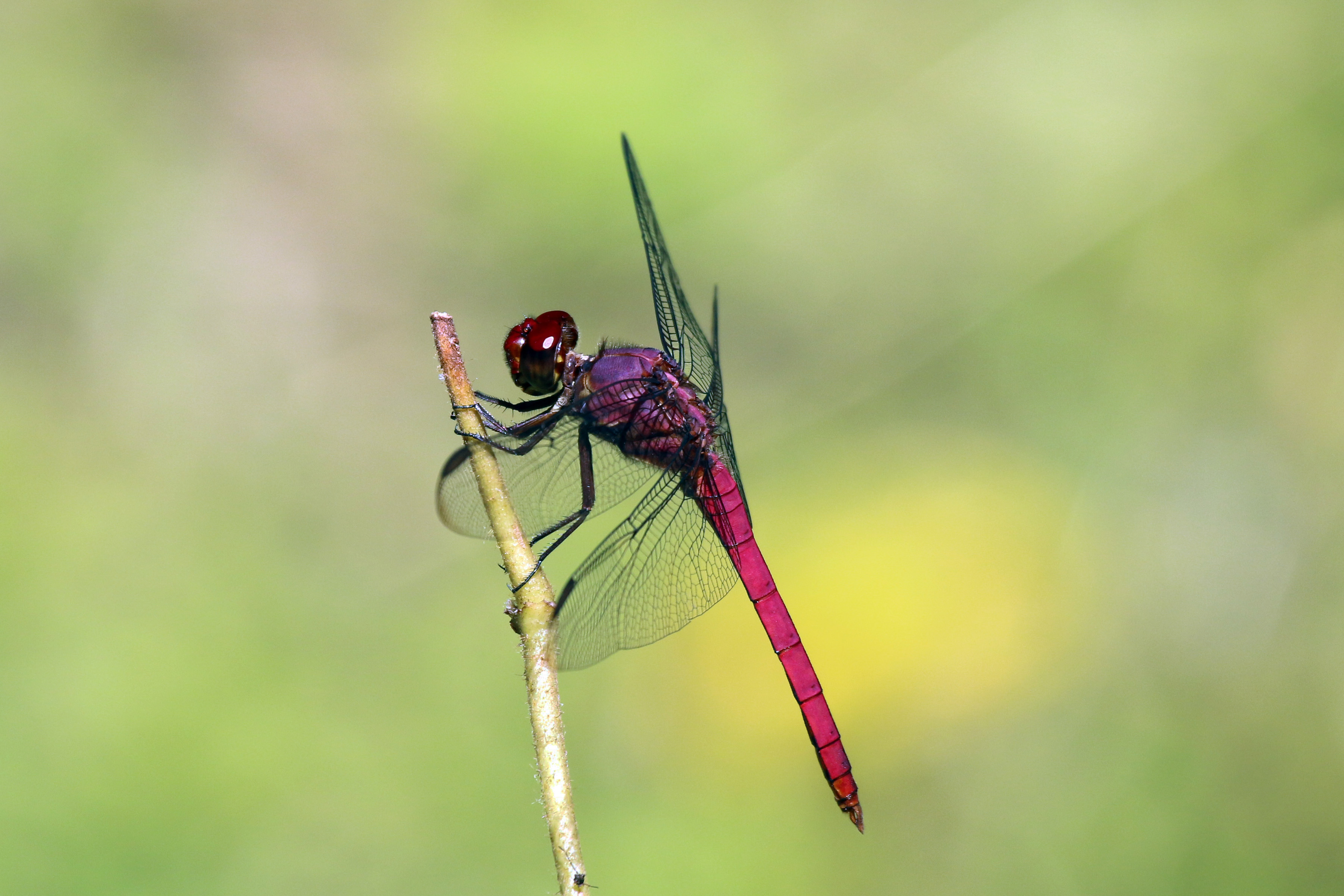
Carmine skimmer (male)

Carmine color is the general term for some deep red colors that are very slightly purplish but are generally slightly closer to pure red than the color crimson is. Some rubies have the color shown below as rich carmine. The deep dark red color shown at right as carmine is the color of the raw unprocessed pigment, but lighter, richer, or brighter colors are produced when the raw pigment is processed, some of which are shown below.

The first recorded use of carmine as a color name in English was in 1523.

== Variations of carmine ==
=== Wild watermelon ===
Wild Watermelon

Color coordinates
- Hex triplet: #FC6C85
- sRGB^{B} (r, g, b): (252, 108, 133)
- HSV (h, s, v): (350°, 57%, 99%)
- CIELCh_{uv} (L, C, h): (64, 101, 4°)
- Source: Crayola
- ISCC–NBS descriptor: Deep pink
- B: Normalized to [0–255] (byte)

The color wild watermelon is displayed at right.

Ultra red is a color formulated by Crayola in 1972. In 1990, the name of the color was changed to wild watermelon.

With a hue code of 350, this color is within the range of carmine colors.

This color is supposed to be fluorescent, but there is no mechanism for displaying fluorescence on a computer screen.

=== Radical red ===
Radical Red

Color coordinates
- Hex triplet: #FF355E
- sRGB^{B} (r, g, b): (255, 53, 94)
- HSV (h, s, v): (348°, 79%, 100%)
- CIELCh_{uv} (L, C, h): (57, 145, 6°)
- Source: Crayola
- ISCC–NBS descriptor: Vivid red
- B: Normalized to [0–255] (byte)

The Crayola crayon color radical red is displayed at right.

The color radical red was formulated by Crayola in 1990.

With a hue code of 348, this color is within the range of carmine colors.

This color is supposed to be fluorescent, but there is no mechanism for displaying fluorescence on a computer screen.

=== Paradise pink ===
Paradise Pink

Color coordinates
- Hex triplet: #E63E62
- sRGB^{B} (r, g, b): (230, 62, 98)
- HSV (h, s, v): (347°, 73%, 90%)
- CIELCh_{uv} (L, C, h): (53, 119, 5°)
- Source: Pantone TPX
- ISCC–NBS descriptor: Vivid red
- B: Normalized to [0–255] (byte)

Displayed at right is the color paradise pink.

The source of this color is the "Pantone Textile Paper eXtended (TPX)" color list, color #17-1755 TPX—Paradise Pink.

Since it has a hue code of 347, the color paradise pink is within the range of carmine colors.

=== Rich carmine ===
Rich Carmine

Color coordinates
- Hex triplet: #D70040
- sRGB^{B} (r, g, b): (215, 0, 64)
- HSV (h, s, v): (342°, 100%, 84%)
- CIELCh_{uv} (L, C, h): (45, 137, 6°)
- Source: Maerz and Paul
- ISCC–NBS descriptor: Vivid red
- B: Normalized to [0–255] (byte)

The rich carmine color tone displayed at right matches the color shown as carmine in the 1930 book A Dictionary of Color (cited below). This color is also called Chinese carmine. This is the color usually referred to as carmine in fashion and interior design.

=== Spanish carmine ===
Spanish Carmine

Color coordinates
- Hex triplet: #D10047
- sRGB^{B} (r, g, b): (209, 0, 71)
- HSV (h, s, v): (340°, 100%, 82%)
- CIELCh_{uv} (L, C, h): (44, 130, 5°)
- Source: Gallego and Sanz
- ISCC–NBS descriptor: Vivid red
- B: Normalized to [0–255] (byte)

Spanish carmine is the color that is called carmín (the Spanish word for "carmine") in the Guía de coloraciones (Guide to colorations) by Rosa Gallego and Juan Carlos Sanz, a color dictionary published in 2005 that is widely popular in the Hispanophone realm.

=== Pictorial carmine ===
Pictorial Carmine

Color coordinates
- Hex triplet: #C30B4E
- sRGB^{B} (r, g, b): (195, 11, 78)
- HSV (h, s, v): (338°, 94%, 76%)
- CIELCh_{uv} (L, C, h): (42, 115, 2°)
- Source: Gallego and Sanz
- ISCC–NBS descriptor: Vivid red
- B: Normalized to [0–255] (byte)

Pictorial carmine is the color that is called Carmín pictórico (Spanish for "pictorial carmine") in the Guía de coloraciones (Guide to colorations) by Rosa Gallego and Juan Carlos Sanz, a color dictionary published in 2005 that is widely popular in the Hispanophone realm.

This is a typical tone of carmine pigment used in painting.

=== Japanese carmine ===
Japanese Carmine

Color coordinates
- Hex triplet: #9D2933
- sRGB^{B} (r, g, b): (157, 41, 51)
- HSV (h, s, v): (355°, 74%, 62%)
- CIELCh_{uv} (L, C, h): (36, 85, 10°)
- Source: JTC
- ISCC–NBS descriptor: Deep red
- B: Normalized to [0–255] (byte)

The color Japanese carmine is shown at right.

The name of this shade of carmine in Japanese is enji-iro (臙脂色), literally "rouge color", as enji (臙脂) means rouge, the cosmetics. This term was later used to form the name of the New World insect, cochineal, used to make red dyes: enji-mushi (臙脂虫).

== Carmine in human culture ==
Crime scene investigation

- The name is often applied to descriptions of blood, because the dark carmine color of the raw pigment shown at the top of the page is the color of dried blood.

Music

- Carmine is one of the colors mentioned in Donovan's "Wear Your Love Like Heaven".
- Carmine red is second of two colors mentioned in Katatonia's song "Lethean".

Sports

- Carmine red and golden yellow are the official colors of Italian football/soccer team AS Roma.
- Carmine red and white are the traditional colors of the Latvia national teams.

Television

- In Chapter 37 of House of Cards Season 3, during an interview between author Thomas Yates and Claire Underwood, during which Claire Underwood is having blood drawn, Underwood asks what color could be used to describe the color of the blood flowing through the tube, and Yates says, "carmine." Underwood responds, "You must be a writer."

Film

- In Dragon Ball Super: Superhero, following the naming trend of all major figures within the Red Ribbon Army, the loyal assistant to Commander Magenta, is named Carmine, who also wears a suit of the same color.

National flags

- Carmine is the color used in the flag of Latvia.

== See also ==
- RAL 3002 Carmine red
- List of colors
