= O. ferruginea =

O. ferruginea may refer to:

- Olea ferruginea, a synonym for Olea europaea subsp. cuspidata, a tree species
- Orthemis ferruginea, the roseate skimmer, a dragonfly species
- Oxyura ferruginea, the ruddy duck, a bird species

== See also ==
- Ferruginea (disambiguation)
