= Forbidden colors =

Forbidden colors may refer to:

- Impossible color, a concept in color theory
- Forbidden colors (Japan), the reserved colors for the robes of the highest ranking government officials in Japan
- Forbidden Colours (song), 1983 song by David Sylvian and Ryuichi Sakamoto
- Forbidden Colors, a 1951 LGBT-themed novel by Yukio Mishima
- Forbidden Colors (dance), 1959 work by choreographer Tatsumi Hijikata
- "Forbidden Colors (painting)", 1988 painting by Félix González-Torres (referring to the colors of the Palestinian flag)
- Forbidden Colours (organization), a Brussels-based LGBT advocacy group focussing on the EU-institutions
