= Roseate =

Roseate, literally rose-colored, rosy, is used in the names of the following animals:

- Roseate cockatoo
- Roseate frog
- Roseate skimmer
- Roseate spoonbill
- Roseate tern
