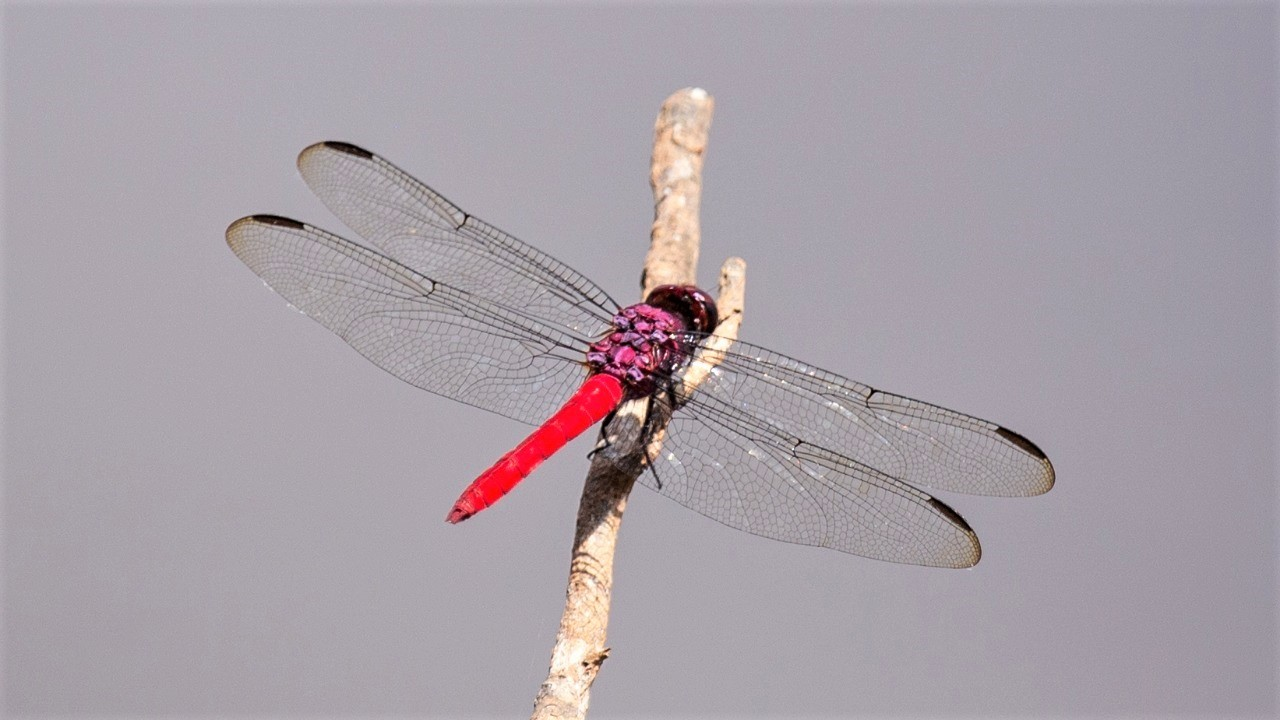

Scientific classification
- Kingdom: Animalia
- Phylum: Arthropoda
- Class: Insecta
- Order: Odonata
- Infraorder: Anisoptera
- Family: Libellulidae
- Genus: Orthemis
- Species: O. schmidti

Binomial name
- Orthemis schmidti Buchholz, 1950

= Orthemis schmidti =

Species of insect

Orthemis schmidti, also known by its common name red-tailed skimmer is a species from the genus Orthemis. The species was originally described in 1950 by Karl Friedrich Buchholz.

== Description ==
Orthemis schmidti has a reddish-brown forehead that stands out at the front. Its face is an olive-ocher color with a reddish-brown border. The upper lip is reddish-brown with a black edge, and the lower lip has a greenish spot in the middle. Its body has different colors too. The first part after the head, called the prothorax, is reddish-brown. The middle part called the thorax, is dark reddish-brown and shines a little bit like purplish-black. On the sides of the thorax, there are thin yellow lines. The insect also has yellow spots on its sides. The front legs and hips are a dark ocher color, while the back legs are a dark brownish-red. The feet are black. The third leg segment has small, pointy teeth that get bigger lower down, and there's a little spine at the end. The insect's body is strong and gets slimmer towards the end. The top of the body is reddish-brown, and the sides of the first and second parts are yellowish. There's a thin yellow stripe along the sides of some body parts. The bottom part of the body is yellowish with a long dark brown stripe that is interrupted in the middle. At the end of the body, there are some brown parts. The insect's wings are clear, like a window, with a brown spot at the tip. The lines in its wings are black and close together. In one set of wings, there is one special cell, and in the other set, there are two special cells. There are some special veins in the wings too, and one of them looks like a zigzag. The back part of the wings has some rows of small cells near the edge, and they make a shape like a bendy loop.

== Range ==
The original description from 1950 was based on a specimen collected in Peru. Recorded observations suggests a range in the northern part of South America, the Caribbean and Central America.

== Sources ==
- Bonner zoologische Beiträge : Herausgeber: Zoologisches Forschungsinstitut und Museum Alexander Koenig, Bonn. Vol. Jahrg.1-2 (1950-1951). Das Forschungsinstitut. 1950.
- Bonner zoologische Beiträge : Herausgeber: Zoologisches Forschungsinstitut und Museum Alexander Koenig, Bonn. Vol. Jahrg.1-2 (1950-1951). Das Forschungsinstitut. 1950. p. 79.
- Bonner zoologische Beiträge : Herausgeber: Zoologisches Forschungsinstitut und Museum Alexander Koenig, Bonn. Vol. Jahrg.21-22 (1970-1971). Das Forschungsinstitut. 1970. p. 150.
