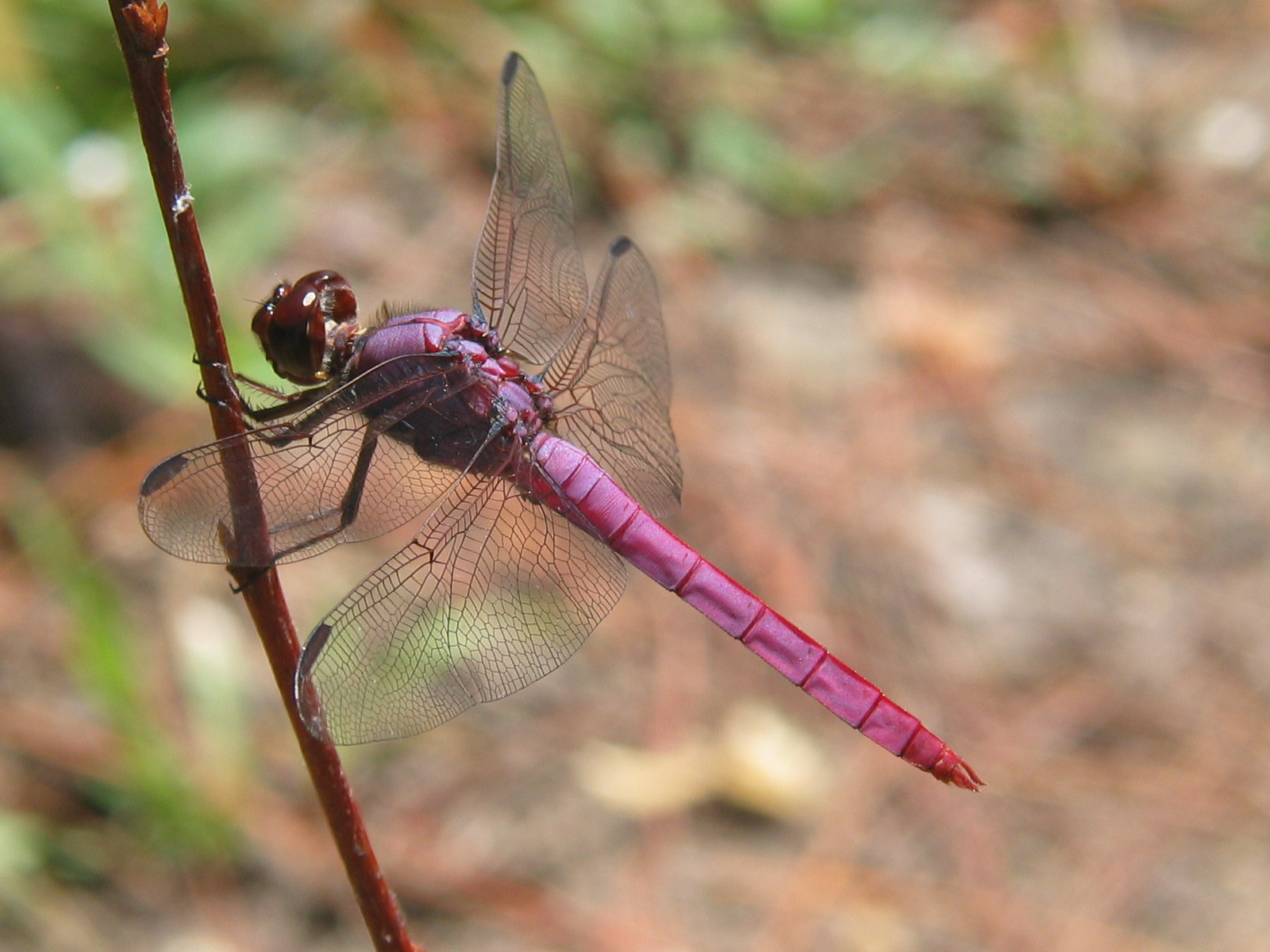
- O. ferruginea

Scientific classification
- Kingdom: Animalia
- Phylum: Arthropoda
- Class: Insecta
- Order: Odonata
- Infraorder: Anisoptera
- Family: Libellulidae
- Subfamily: Libellulinae
- Genus: Orthemis; Hagen, 1861

Type species
- Orthemis ferruginea

= Orthemis =

Tropical King Skimmers

Genus of dragonflies

Orthemis is a genus of large Neotropical dragonflies, commonly called Tropical King Skimmers. The males are generally red and the females brown.

== Species ==
The genus contains the following species:

Male	Female	Scientific name	Common name	Distribution
		Orthemis aciculata von Ellenrieder, 2012		Surinam
		Orthemis aequilibris Calvert, 1909		Central america, northern south america
		Orthemis ambinigra Calvert, 1909		Nova Teutonia, Santa Catarina State, Brazil,
		Orthemis ambirufa Calvert, 1909		Colombia, Venezuela and the Guyanas south to N Bolivia and Brazil
		Orthemis anthracina De Marmels, 1989		Venezuela and Trinidad south through Surinam and N Peru
		Orthemis attenuata (Erichson, 1848)		Colombia, Venezuela, and Guyana south to Peru, Bolivia, and Brazil
		Orthemis biolleyi Calvert, 1906	Yellow-lined Skimmer	Colombia, Brazil, Peru
		Orthemis celata von Ellenrieder, 2012		Pará State, Brazil
		Orthemis cinnamomea von Ellenrieder, 2009		Ecuador to N Peru
		Orthemis concolor Ris, 1919	Concolored Skimmer	Venezuela and Trinidad through the Guyanas to N Brazil
		Orthemis coracina von Ellenrieder, 2009		Colombia, Surinam, and N Brazil to Ecuador and N Peru
		Orthemis cultriformis Calvert, 1899		Costa Rica in Central America south to Paraguay and N Argentina in South America
		Orthemis discolor (Burmeister, 1839)	Carmine Skimmer	W Brazil and N Peru
		Orthemis faaseni von Ellenrieder, 2012		Brazil, Rondônia State, Porto Velho
		Orthemis ferruginea (Fabricius, 1775)	Roseate Skimmer	United States to Brazil.
		Orthemis flavopicta Kirby, 1889		Bolívar State in SVenezuela and N Brazil south to central Brazil and Bolivia
		Orthemis garrisoni von Ellenrieder, 2012		Panama
		Orthemis harpago von Ellenrieder, 2009		Panguana, Río Yuyapichis, Huanuco Prov., Peru
		Orthemis levis Calvert, 1906		Mexico to N Colombia and Venezuela
		Orthemis macrostigma (Rambur, 1842)		West Indies
		Orthemis nodiplaga Karsch, 1891		Brazil
		Orthemis paulsoni von Ellenrieder, 2012		SE Peru and Ecuador
		Orthemis philipi von Ellenrieder, 2009		Paraguay and N Argentina
		Orthemis plaumanni Buchholz, 1950		
		Orthemis regalis Ris, 1910	Regal Skimmer	Venezuela and Surinam to Ecuador N Peru and N Brazil
		Orthemis schmidti Buchholz, 1950	Red-tailed Skimmer	Mexico to Brazil and Peru
		Orthemis sulphurata Hagen, 1868		Colombia, Ecuador
		Orthemis tambopatae von Ellenrieder, 2009		S Peru and Bolivia
		Orthemis teres von Ellenrieder, 2012		Bolivia
