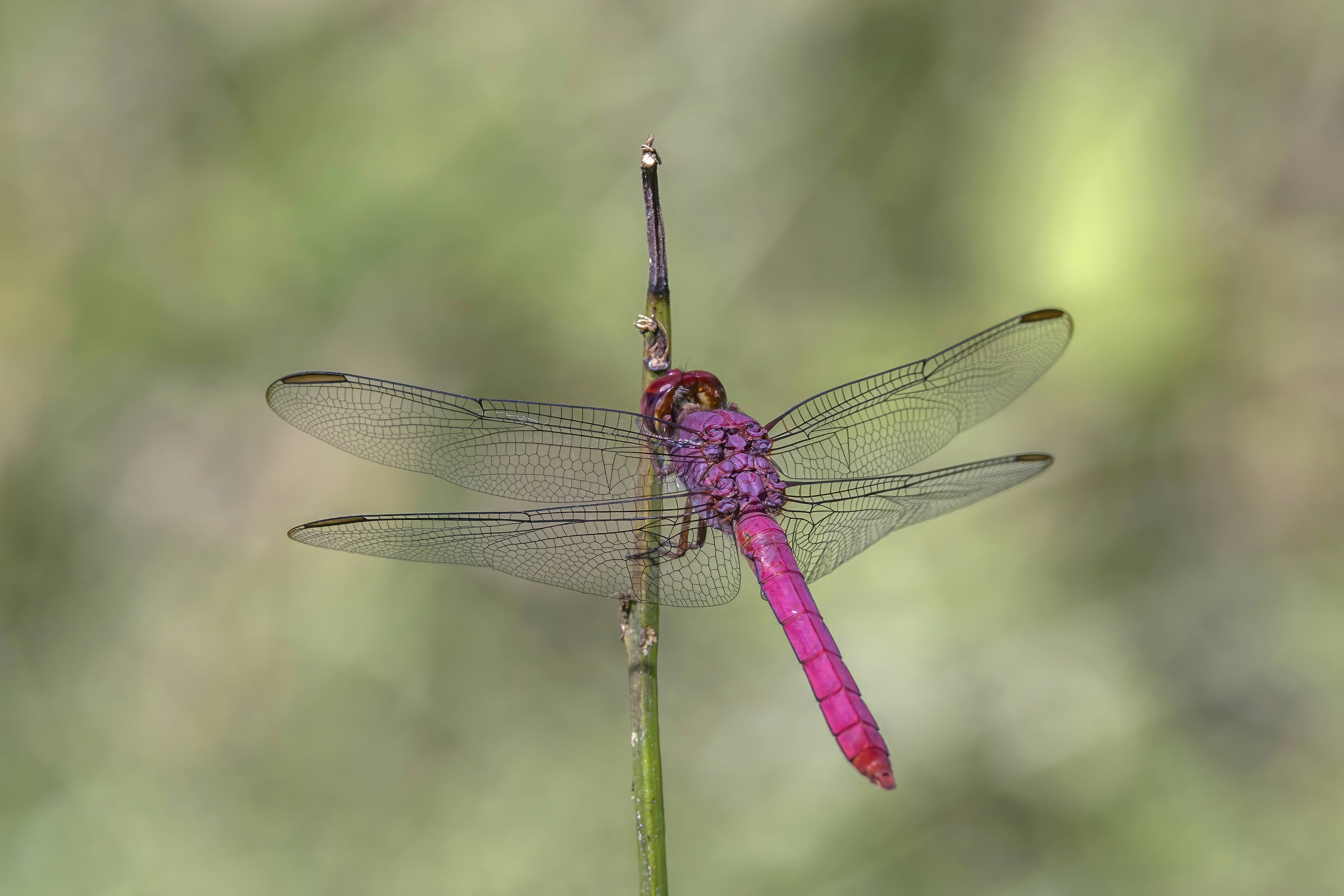
- Male, Guatemala
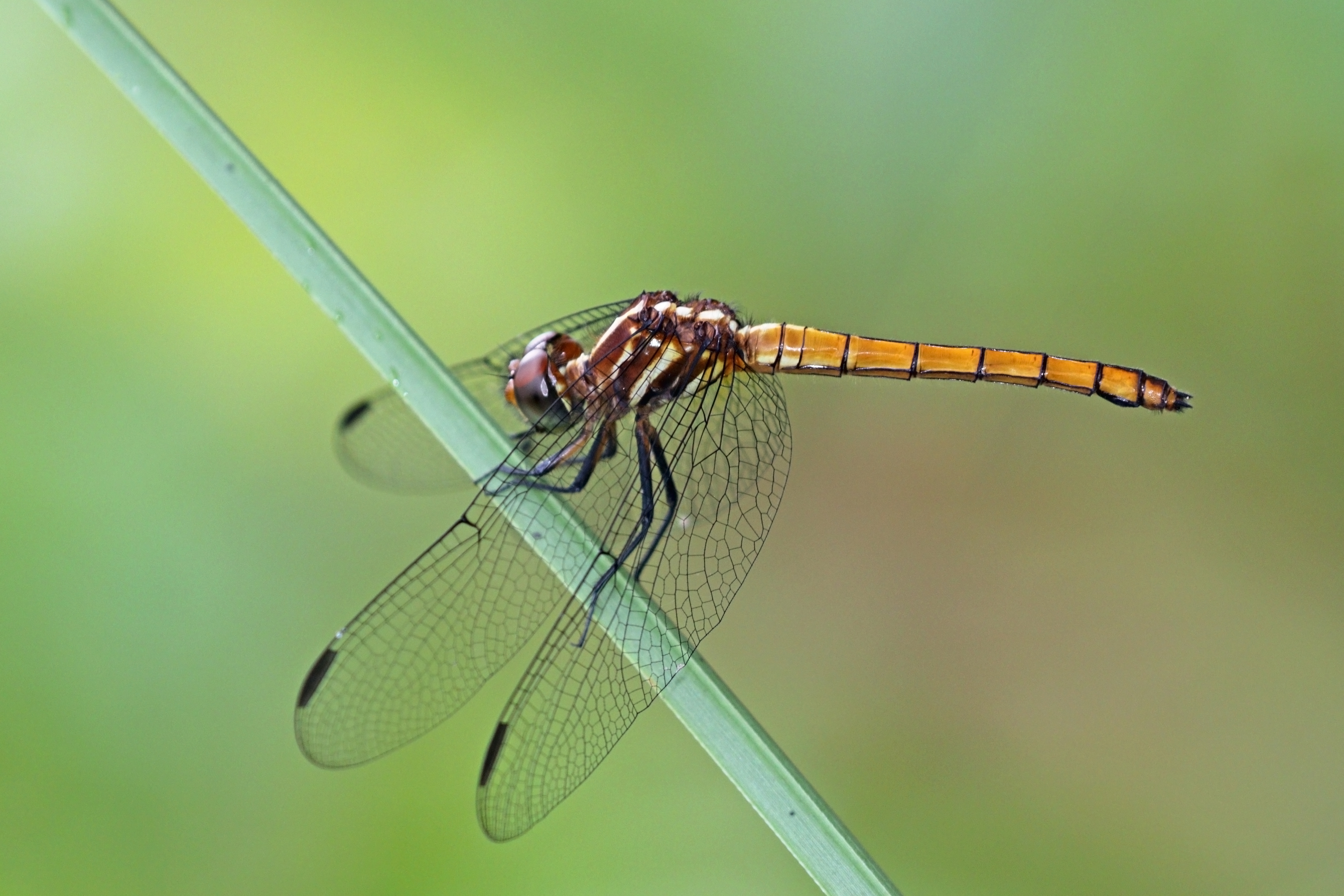
- Female, Panama

Conservation status
- Least Concern (IUCN 3.1)

Scientific classification
- Kingdom: Animalia
- Phylum: Arthropoda
- Clade: Pancrustacea
- Class: Insecta
- Order: Odonata
- Infraorder: Anisoptera
- Family: Libellulidae
- Genus: Orthemis
- Species: O. discolor

Binomial name
- Orthemis discolor (Burmeister, 1839)

= Orthemis discolor =

Species of dragonfly

Orthemis discolor, known generally as the carmine skimmer or orange-bellied skimmer, is a species of skimmer in the dragonfly family Libellulidae.

The IUCN conservation status of Orthemis discolor is "LC", least concern, with no immediate threat to the species' survival. The population is stable. The IUCN status was reviewed in 2017.

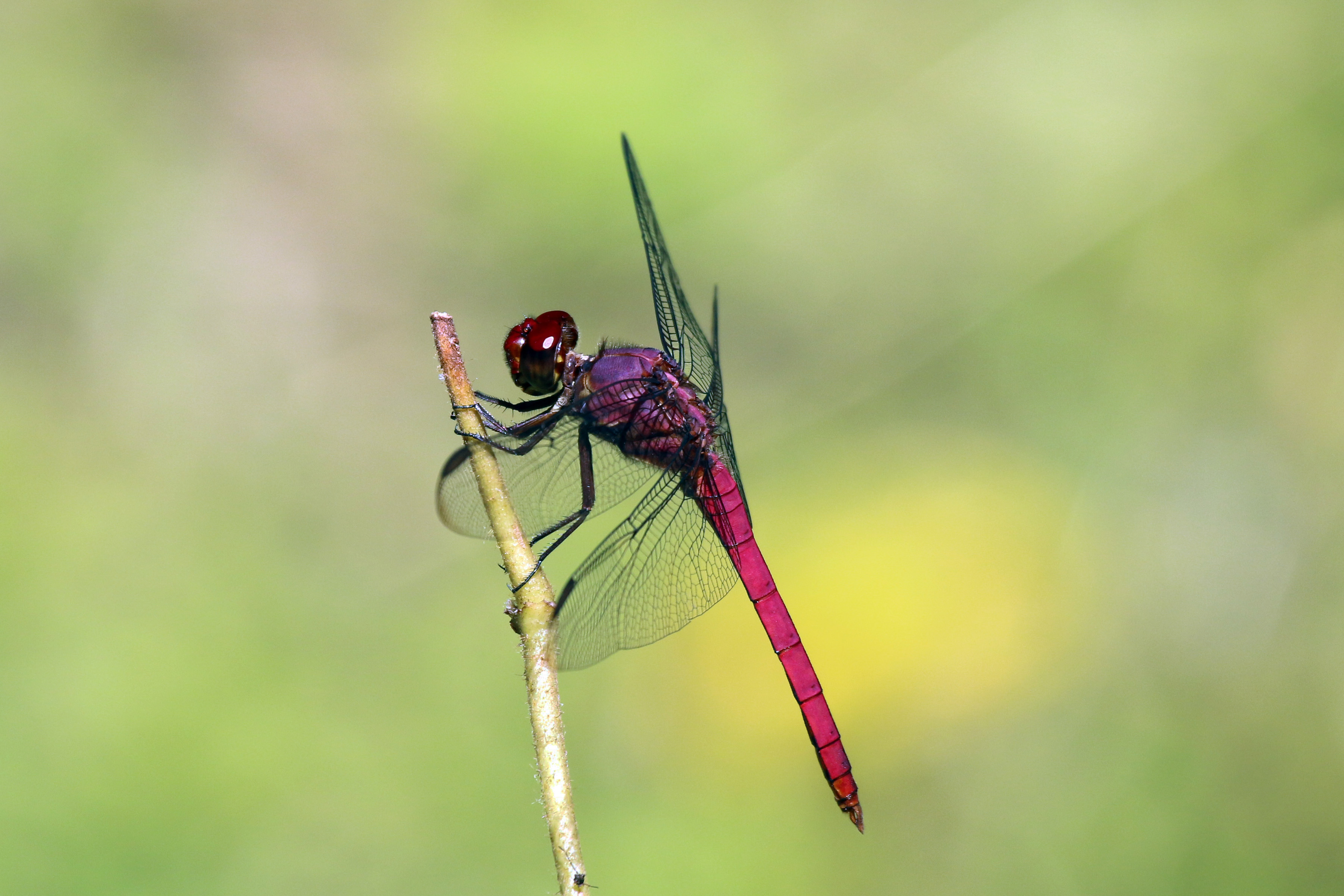
Carmine skimmer, Orthemis discolor

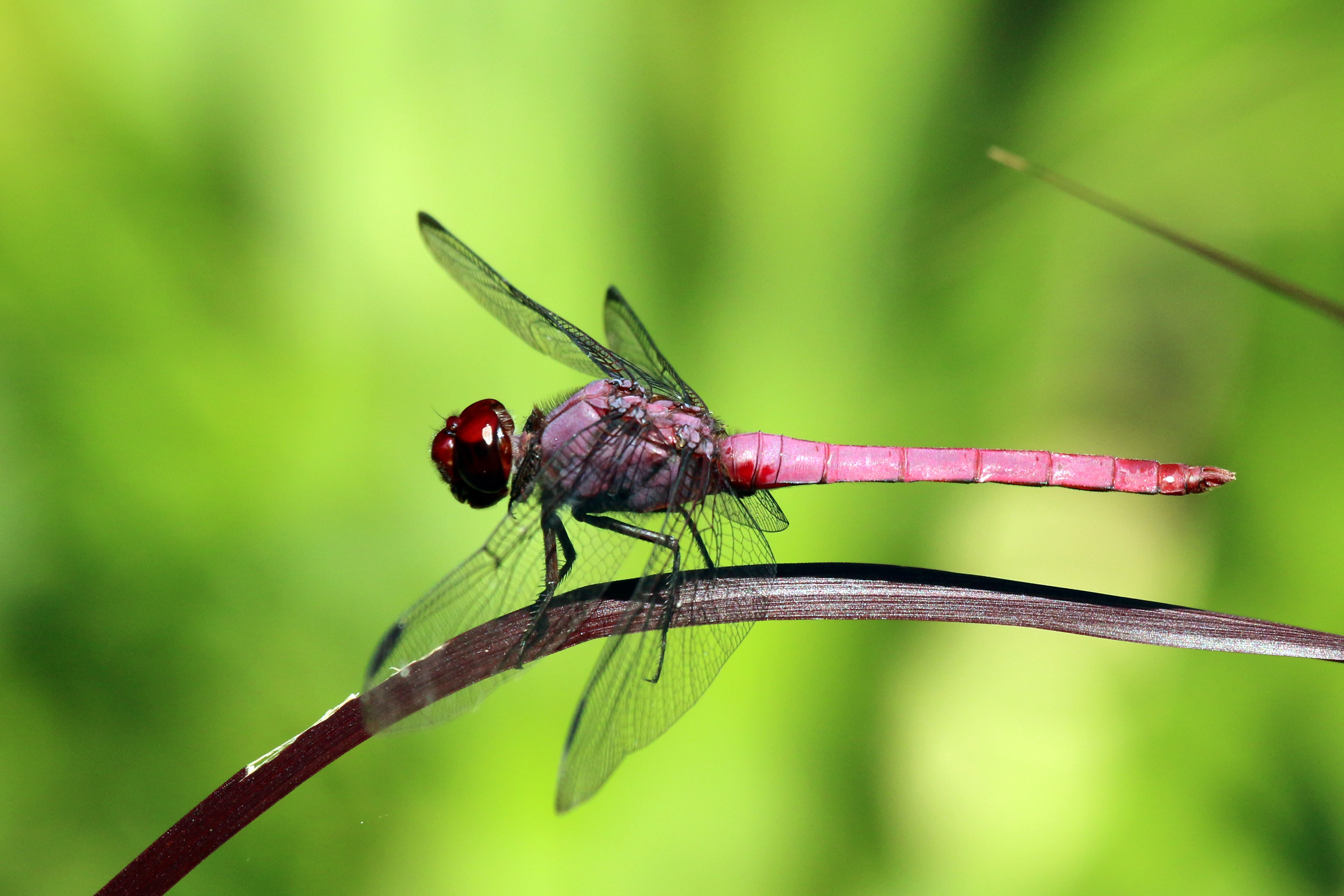
Carmine skimmer, Orthemis discolor
