= Lusty gallant =

Shade of pink

Color coordinates
- Hex triplet: #FFCCCC
- sRGB^{B} (r, g, b): (255, 204, 204)
- HSV (h, s, v): (0°, 20%, 100%)
- CIELCh_{uv} (L, C, h): (86, 32, 12°)
- Source: https://www.crispedge.com/color/ffcccc/
- B: Normalized to [0–255] (byte)

Lusty gallant is a colour that originated in 16th century Elizabethan England. Named after a popular Tudor dance (which in turn came from a ballad), it is a shade of light pink.

== Origin ==
The connection between the colour and dance is unknown. However, lusty gallant's name is said to have come from the practice of dressmakers attempting to catch consumer's attention with eccentric colour names. It proved effective, and lusty gallant became a popular choice for dresses.

The oldest surviving mention of the colour is William Harrison's 1577 book, The Description of England, in which he describes some contemporary colours:

I might here name a sort of hues devised for the nonce wherewith to please fantastical heads, as gooseturd green, pease-porridge tawny, popinjay blue, lusty gallant. the-devil-in-the-head (I should say "the hedge"), and suchlike; but I pass them over, thinking it sufficient to have said thus much of apparel generally, when nothing can particularly be spoken of any constancy thereof.
