= Murasaki (band) =

Japanese independent band

Murasaki 群咲
- Origin: Japan
- Genres: Pop punk
- Years active: 2020–present
- Members: Chisa Kimura (vocalist); RamSeeni (keyboardist)
- Website: https://murasaki-asks.localinfo.jp/

Murasaki (群咲) is a Japanese pop punk band formed in 2020 in Japan. The band released their first single "Not Me" on August 12, 2020, and the first album Ashitakoso on January 31, 2022.

== Members ==
- Chisa Kimura (木村千咲, Kimura Chisa) Vocals, lyrics
- RamSeeni (ラムシーニ, RamSeeni) Keyboard, composition, arrangement

== Discography ==
Singles

- Not Me (2020)
- Floating in the deep sea (2020)
- Invisible girl goes in the sky (2020)
- Mozōseikatsu (2023)

Albums

- Tomorrow (2022)
- The future looks bleak (2024)

Others

- NPC (2021)

== Filmography ==
Radio

- Murasaki no kosan burunara imana node wa!? (群咲の古参ぶるなら今なのでは!?) 2021/10/3-present, MC
- Vinyl Music ~Kayōkyoku 2.0~ (ヴァイナル・ミュージック～歌謡曲2.0～) 2022/01/22, MC
- Vinyl Music ~Kayōkyoku 2.0~ (ヴァイナル・ミュージック～歌謡曲2.0～) 2022/02/09, MC
- Non ko to Nobita no animesukuranburu (ノン子とのび太のアニメスクランブル) 2022/04/13, Guest

Web shows

- DAM CHANNEL (DAMチャンネル) 2022/02, Guest
