= Forbidden colors (Japan) =

Colors used by aristocracy in Heian-kyō

Forbidden сolors
RGB	Name
#DD9159	Sumac-dyed
#6C9956	Pale oak
#E06351	Sawtooth oak
#FC7F31	Ochre
#561649	Deep purple
#FBB92D	Rich gardenia
#A40522	Deep scarlet
#790505	Sappanwood

The system of forbidden colors (禁色, kinjiki) developed in Japan in the 8th century saw certain colors of traditional court clothing reserved for certain ranks of court official at the Imperial Court in Kyoto. The hierarchy of colors was developed under the Ritsuryō system.

== History ==
Sumac dye (黄櫨染, kōrozen) was used only for the outerwear of the Emperor of Japan. It was banned for use by anyone except the Japanese monarch. To this day, the ceremonial clothes of the Emperor worn during the enthronement ceremony are dyed in this color, extracted from sumac (Toxicodendron succedaneum), a Japanese wax tree.

Seven additional colors were installed in the 10th and 11th centuries:

- Pale oak (青白橡, aoshirotsurubami) is the color of the outerrobes of the Emperor of Japan. As an exception, this color could be worn by the concubines and mistresses of the monarch, who were in the position of palace servants of the 4th rank, as well as secretaries of the treasury of the 6th rank.
- Sawtooth oak (赤白橡, akashirotsurubami) is the color of the outerwear of the ex-Emperor of Japan.
- Ochre (黄丹, ōtan) is the color of the outerwear of the crown prince of Japan.
- Deep purple (深紫, kokimurasaki) is the outerwear color of 1st rank aristocrats.
- Rich gardenia (深支子, kokikuchinashi) is a reserve forbidden color, a substitute for ochre. Produced from the fruits of gardenia (Gardenia jasminoides), permission to wear this color could be granted by imperial rescript.
- Deep scarlet (深緋, kokiake) is an alternate forbidden color, a substitute for deep purple. Permission to wear this color could be granted by imperial rescript.
- Sappanwood (蘇芳, su'ō) is a reserve forbidden color, a substitute for deep purple. Produced from the fruit of Biancaea sappan, permission to wear this color could be granted by imperial rescript.

During the Meiji period (1867–1911) of the 19th century, the ban was lifted from most colors except sumac, ochre and gardenia.

== See also ==
- Sumptuary law
- Royal purple

== Bibliography ==
- Nihon Shikisai Gakkai (1985). Shinpen shikisai kagaku handobukku (in Japanese). Tokyo Daigaku Shuppankai. ISBN 4-13-061000-7.
- Shaver, R. (2013). Kabuki Costume. Tuttle Publishing. p. 79. ISBN 9781462903986.
