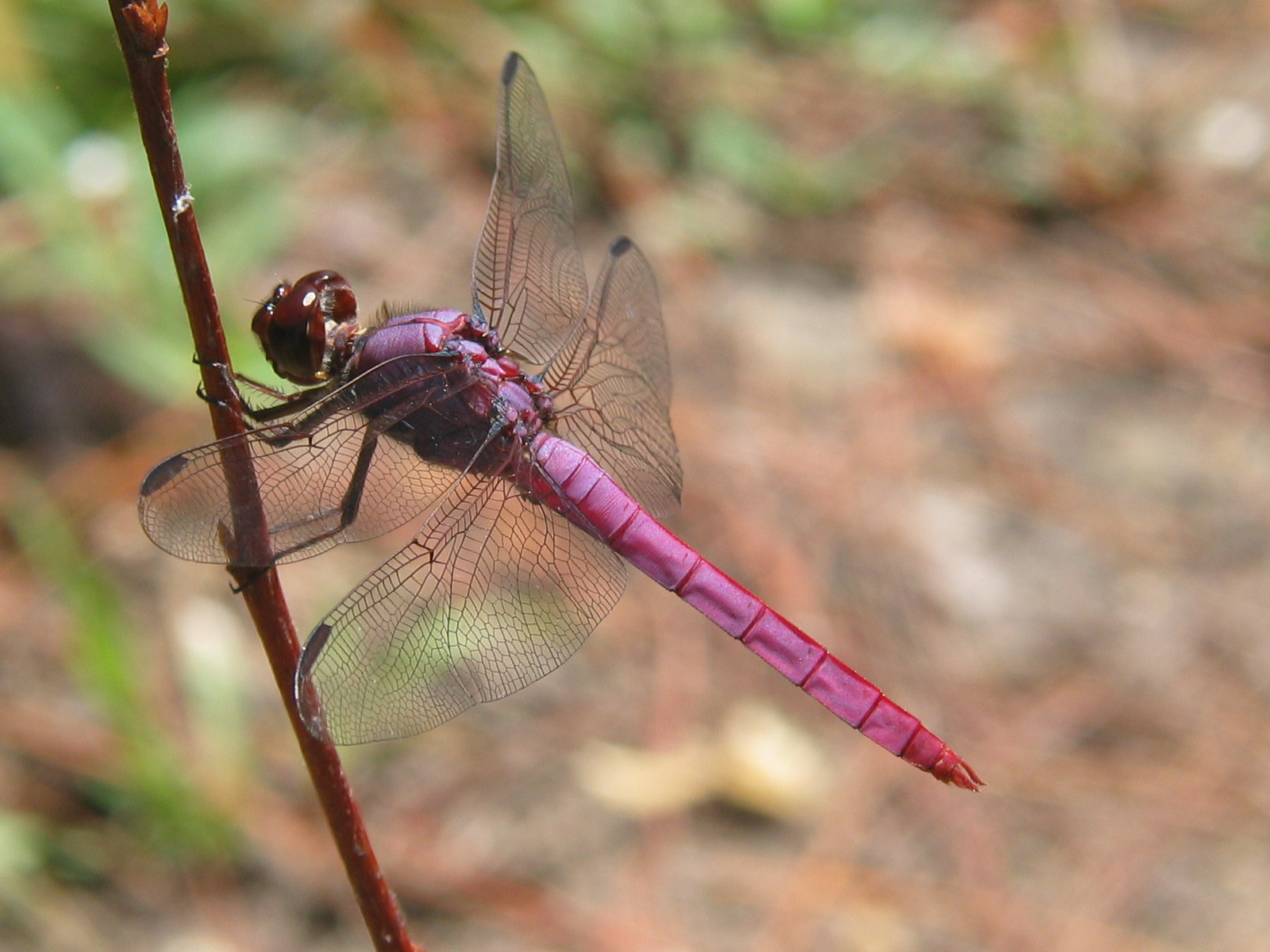

Conservation status
- Least Concern (IUCN 3.1)

Scientific classification
- Kingdom: Animalia
- Phylum: Arthropoda
- Class: Insecta
- Order: Odonata
- Infraorder: Anisoptera
- Family: Libellulidae
- Genus: Orthemis
- Species: O. ferruginea

Binomial name
- Orthemis ferruginea (Fab., 1775)

= Roseate skimmer =

Species of dragonfly

The roseate skimmer (Orthemis ferruginea) is a species of dragonfly in the family Libellulidae. It is native to the Americas, where its distribution extends from the United States to Brazil. It is common and widespread. It is an introduced species in Hawaii.

The male of the species has a rose pink and red abdomen. The female has an orange-brown abdomen with clear orange veins and a brownish thorax with a light stripe down the back. The wings are normally clear except for brown pterostigmata at the leading edges. It is 46–55 millimetres (1.8–2.2 in) in length with a wingspan 35–44 millimetres (1.4–1.7 in) long. Males are highly territorial, defending their territory aggressively against other male roseate skimmers that fly near.

It tolerates a wide range of habitat types, but usually requires open water. This can include disturbed and artificial water bodies, such as tanks and ditches. It can live in open or vegetated land. It breeds in the mud.
