= Traditional colors of Japan =

Collection of colors traditionally used in Japanese-related things

The traditional colors of Japan are a collection of colors traditionally used in Japanese art, literature, textiles such as kimono, and other Japanese arts and crafts.

== History ==
The traditional colors of Japan trace their historical origins to the Twelve Level Cap and Rank System which was established in 603 by Prince Shōtoku and based on the five Chinese elements. In this system, rank and social hierarchy were displayed and determined by certain colors. Colors known as kinjiki (禁色, "forbidden colors") were strictly reserved for the robes of the Imperial family and highest ranking court officials; for example, the color ōtan (orange) was used as the color for the robes of the Crown Prince and use by anyone else was prohibited. Colors known as yurushiiro (許し色, "permissible colors") were permitted for use by the common people.

Most names of colors originate from the names of plants, flowers, and animals that bore or resembled them. Certain colors and dyeing techniques have been used since the Asuka period, while others had been developed as late as the Meiji period when synthetic dyes became common. Due to the long history of use of this color system, some variations in color and names exist.

== Colors ==
=== Red/violet series ===
Name	Romanized	English translation	RGB	Hex triplet	Name	Romanized	English translation	RGB	Hex triplet
一斤染	Ikkonzome	One kin (0.6 kg (1.3 lb)) dye	240,143,144	#F08F90	桃色	Momo-iro	Peach-colored	244,121,131	#F47983
紅梅色	Kōbai-iro	Red plum colored	219,90,107	#DB5A6B	中紅	Nakabeni	Medium crimson (dye)	201,55,86	#C93756
桜色	Sakura-iro	Cherry blossom color	252,201,185	#FCC9B9	退紅	Arazome	Washed-out crimson (dye)	255,179,167	#FFB3A7
薄紅	Usubeni	Pale crimson (dye)	242,102,108	#F2666C					

=== Red series ===
Name	Romanized	English translation	RGB	Hex triplet	Name	Romanized	English translation	RGB	Hex triplet
鴇羽色	Tokiha-iro	Ibis wing color	245,143,132	#F58F84	桜鼠	Sakuranezumi	Cherry blossom mouse grey	172,129,118	#AC8181
長春色	Chōshun-iro	Long spring (season) color	185,87,84	#B95754	唐紅/韓紅	Karakurenai	Foreign crimson (Note: "Since magenta, an imported artificial color, also resembled Kara-kurenai (here also Kara means Korea; kurenai means red), people started to call the deep red formerly known as kara-ai by the new designation Kara-kurenai (here, however, "Kara" means China).")	201,31,55	#C91F37
臙脂色	Enji-iro	Cochineal red/rouge	157,41,51	#9D2933	深緋	Kokiake	Deep scarlet	123,59,58	#7B3B3A
甚三紅	Jinzamomi	Thrice-dyed crimson	247,102,90	#F7665A	水がき	Mizugaki	Water persimmon	181,108,96	#B56C60
梅鼠	Umenezumi	Plum-blossom mouse grey	151,100,90	#97645A	蘇芳香	Su'ōkō	Sappanwood incense	162,79,70	#A24F46
赤紅	Akabeni	Pure crimson (dye)	195,39,43	#C3272B	真朱	Shinshu	True red	143,29,33	#8F1D21
小豆色	Azuki-iro	Azuki bean color	103,36,34	#672422	銀朱	Ginshu	Greyed red (lit. silvered red)	188,45,41	#BC2D29
海老茶	Ebicha	Maroon (shrimp brown)	94,40,36	#5E2824	栗梅	Kiriume	Red-brown (lit. chestnut-plum)	139,53,45	#8B352D
曙色	Akebono-iro	Dawn-color	250,123,98	#FA7B62	珊瑚色	Sango-iro	Coral color	248,103,79	#F8674F
猩々緋	Shōjōhi	Red-orange (lit. orangutan-colored)	220,48,35	#DC3023	芝翫茶	Shikancha	Wilted brown (lit. wilted lawn-clippings)	171,76,61	#AB4C3D
柿渋色	Kakishibu-iro	Persimmon-juice color	147,67,55	#934337	紅樺	Benikaba	Red birch	157,43,34	#9D2B22
紅鳶	Benitobi	Red kite (bird species)	145,50,40	#913228	紅檜皮	Benihibata	Cypress bark red	111,48,40	#6F3028
黒鳶	Kurotobi	Black kite (bird species)	53,30,28	#351E1C	紅緋	Benihi	Blood red	243,83,54	#F35336
照柿	Terigaki	Glazed persimmon	211,78,54	#D34E36	緋	Ake	Scarlet (blood)	207,58,36	#CF3A24
江戸茶	Edocha	Red-brown (Edo brown)	161,61,45	#A13D2D	紅柄色	Bengara-iro	Dyestalk red (lit. the color from dying with the stalk of the beni (safflower) plant)	145,50,37	#913225
檜皮色	Hihada-iro	Cypress bark color	117,46,35	#752E23	宍色	Shishi-iro	Meat-color	249,144,111	#F9906F
洗朱	Araishu	Rinsed-out red	255,121,82	#FF7952	赤香色	Akakō-iro	Red incense-colored	240,127,94	#F07F5E
ときがら茶	Tokigaracha	Brewed mustard-brown	230,131,100	#E68364	黄丹	Ōtan	Ochre (earthen yellow-red-brown)	255,78,32	#FF4E20
蘇比	Sohi	Overdyed/refreshed red-brown	227,92,56	#E35C38	遠州茶	Enshūcha	Muddy brown (lit. the brown of a distant river)	203,102,73	#CB6649
唐茶	Karacha	Spicy red-brown (Chinese tea brown)	179,92,68	#B35C44	樺茶	Kabacha	Birch brown	177,74,48	#B14A30
宗傳唐茶	Sōdenkaracha	Faded spicy red-brown	155,83,63	#9B533F	雀茶	Suzumecha	Sparrow-brown	140,71,54	#8C4736
栗皮茶	Kurikawacha	Chestnut-leather brown	96,40,30	#60281E	百塩茶	Momoshiocha	Boiled red bean brown	84,45,36	#542D24
鳶色	Tobi-iro	Ibis-color	76,34,27	#4C221B	朱色	Shu-iro	Cinnabar-color	255,53,0	#FF3500

=== Yellow/red series ===
Name	Romanized	English translation	RGB	Hex triplet	Name	Romanized	English translation	RGB	Hex triplet
胡桃染	Kurumizome	Walnut-dyed	159,116,98	#9F7462	蒲色	Kaba-iro	Cattail color	182,73,37	#B64925
黄櫨染	Kōrozen	Sumac-dyed	89,43,31	#592B1F	焦茶	Kogecha	Scorched brown	53,31,25	#351F19
深支子	Kokikuchinashi	Rich gardenia	245,127,79	#F57F4F	洗柿	Araigaki	Washed-out persimmon	236,130,84	#EC8254
代赭色	Taisha-iro	Red ochre color	159,82,51	#9F5233	赤白橡	Akashirotsurubami	Sawtooth oak	236,149,108	#EC956C
礪茶	Tonocha	Polished brown	152,85,56	#985538	煎茶色	Sencha-iro	Green tea-colored	130,75,53	#824B35
洒落柿	Sharegaki	Stylish persimmon	255,162,107	#FFA26B	薄柿	Usugaki	Pale persimmon	252,164,116	#FCA474
萱草色	Kanzō-iro	Daylily-colored	255,137,54	#FF8936	梅染	Umezome	Plum-dyed	250,146,88	#FA9258
紅鬱金	Beni'ukon	Red-bronze (lit. red dye and turmeric)	251,129,54	#FB8136	丁子茶	Chōjicha	Clove-brown	143,88,60	#8F583C
憲法染	Kenpōzome	named after the swordsman Yoshioka Kenpo (lit. Legal dye)	46,33,27	#2E211B	枇杷茶	Biwacha	Loquat tree-brown	171,97,52	#AB6134
琥珀色	Kohaku-iro	Amber color	202,105,36	#CA6924	淡香	Usukō	Pale incense	255,165,101	#FFA565
朽葉色	Kuchiba-iro	Decaying leaves color	213,120,53	#D57835	金茶	Kincha	Golden brown	198,107,39	#C66B27
丁子染	Chōjizome	Clove-dyed	169,98,50	#A96232	狐色	Kitsune-iro	Fox-color	152,86,41	#985629
柴染	Fushizome	Brushwood-dyed	140,89,57	#8C5939	伽羅色	Kyara-iro	Aloewood-color	106,67,45	#6A432D
煤竹色	Susutake-iro	Weathered bamboo (lit. "sooty")	89,58,39	#593A27	白茶	Shiracha	White tea-colored	196,142,105	#C48E69
黄土色	Ōdo-iro	Ochre (lit. earthen yellow)	190,127,81	#BE7F51	銀煤竹	Kinsusutake	Golden-grey bamboo (dried and weathered)	125,78,45	#7D4E2D
黄唐茶	Kigaracha	Chinese yellow tea-colored	183,112,45	#B7702D	媚茶	Kobicha	Kobi tea	107,68,35	#6B4423
赤朽葉	Akakuchiba	Red fallen leaves	219,132,73	#DB8449					

=== Yellow series ===
Name	Romanized	English	RGB	Hex triplet	Name	Romanized	English	RGB	Hex triplet
浅黄	Asagi	Light yellow	247,187,125	#F7BB7D	山吹色	Yamabuki-iro	Golden yellow (Kerria japonica)	255,164,0	#FFA400
玉子色	Tamago-iro	Egg-colored	255,166,49	#FFA631	櫨染	Hajizome	Sumac-dyed	224,138,30	#E08A1E
山吹茶	Yamabukicha	Gold-brown	203,126,31	#CB7E1F	桑染	Kuwazome	Mulberry-dyed	197,127,46	#C57F2E
生壁色	Namakabe-iro	The color of undried plaster	120,94,73	#785E49	梔子	Kuchinashi	Cape jasmine or gardenia	255,185,90	#FFB95A
玉蜀黍色	Tōmorokoshi-iro	Corn-colored	250,169,69	#FAA945	白橡	Shirotsurubami	White oak	206,159,111	#CE9F6F
黄橡	Kitsurubami	Golden oak	187,129,65	#BB8141	藤黄	Tō'ō	Gamboge	255,182,30	#FFB61E
花葉色	Hanaba-iro or kayou-iro	Floral leaf-colored	255,185,78	#FFB94E	鳥の子色	Torinoko-iro	Eggshell paper-colored	226,190,159	#E2BE9F
鬱金色	Ukon-iro	Turmeric-colored	230,155,58	#E69B3A	黄朽葉	Kikuchiba	Golden fallen leaves	226,156,69	#E29C45
利休白茶	Rikyūshiracha	Faded Sen no Rikyū's tea	176,146,122	#B0927A	利休茶	Rikyūcha	Sen no Rikyū's tea	130,107,88	#826B58
灰汁色	Aku-iro	Lye-colored	127,107,93	#7F6B5D	肥後煤竹	Higosusutake	Japanese iris and sooty bamboo	127,93,59	#7F5D3B
路考茶	Rokōcha	Contemplation in a tea garden	102,83,67	#665343	海松茶	Mirucha	Simmered seaweed	76,61,48	#4C3D30
菜種油色	Nataneyu-iro	Rapeseed oil-colored	161,121,23	#A17917	黄海松茶	Kimirucha	Yellow Sea pine-brown	137,108,57	#896C39
鶯茶	Uguisucha	Japanese bush warbler-brown (greenish brown)	92,72,39	#5C4827	菜の花色	Nanohanacha	Rape-blossom brown	227,177,48	#E3B130
苅萱	Kariyasu	Japanese triandra grass (Themeda japonica)	226,177,60	#E2B13C	黄蘗	Kihada	Amur cork tree (Phellodendron amurense)	243,193,58	#F3C13A
蒸栗色	Mushikuri-iro	Steamed chestnut color	211,177,125	#D3B17D	青朽葉	Aokuchiba	Pale fallen leaves	170,135,54	#AA8736
鶸茶	Hiwacha	Finch-brown (Cardueline finch)	149,123,56	#957B38	女郎花	Ominaeshi	Patrinia flowers (Patrinia scabiosaefolia)	217,182,17	#D9B611
鶯色	Uguisu-iro	Japanese bush warbler-colored	100,85,48	#645530					

=== Yellow/green series ===
Name	Romanized	English	RGB	Hex triplet	Name	Romanized	English	RGB	Hex triplet
鶸色	Hiwa-iro	Greenfinch color	189,169,40	#BDA928	青白橡	Aoshirotsurubami	Pale oak	155,168,141	#9BA88D
柳茶	Yanagicha	Willow tea	156,138,77	#9C8A4D	璃寛茶	Rikancha	Rikan brown	83,74,50	#534A32
藍媚茶	Aikobicha	Indigo tea	71,63,45	#473F2D	苔色	Koke-iro	Moss color	139,125,58	#8B7D3A
海松色	Miru-iro	Codium fragile seaweed color	82,75,42	#524B2A	千歳茶	Sensaicha	Thousand year old brown	59,52,41	#3B3429
梅幸茶	Baikōcha	Baiko brown	133,124,85	#857C55	岩井茶	Iwaicha	Iwai brown	94,85,69	#5E5545
鶸萌黄	Hiwamo'egi	Siskin sprout yellow	122,148,46	#7A942E	柳煤竹	Yanagisusutake	Sooty willow bamboo	77,75,58	#4D4B3A
裏柳	Urahayanagi	Underside of willow leaves	188,181,140	#BCB58C	淡萌黄	Usumo'egi	Pale young green onion	141,178,85	#8DB255
柳染	Yanagizome	Willow-dyed	140,158,94	#8C9E5E	萌黄	Mo'egi	Fresh onion	91,137,48	#5B8930
青丹	Aoni	Blue-black clay	82,89,59	#52593B	松葉色	Matsuba-iro	Pine needle color	69,77,50	#454D32

=== Green/blue green series ===
Name	Romanized	English	RGB	Hex triplet	Name	Romanized	English	RGB	Hex triplet
薄青	Usu'ao	Pale blue	140,156,118	#8C9C76	若竹色	Wakatake-iro	Young bamboo color	107,147,98	#6B9362
柳鼠	Yanaginezumi	Willow grey	129,123,105	#817B69	老竹色	Oitake-iro	Old bamboo color	94,100,79	#5E644F
千歳緑	Chitosemidori	Thousand year old green	55,66,49	#374231	緑	Midori	Green	42,96,59	#2A603B
白緑	Byakuroku	Whitish green	165,186,147	#A5BA93	錆青磁	Sabiseiji	Rusty celadon	137,138,116	#898A74
緑青	Rokushō	Patina	64,122,82	#407A52	木賊色	Tokusa-iro	Horsetail color	61,93,66	#3D5D42
御納戸茶	Onandocha	Storeroom brown	61,64,53	#3D4035	青竹色	Aotake-iro	Green bamboo color	0,100,66	#006442
利休鼠	Rikyūnezumi	Greyish dark green	101,98,85	#656255	びろうど	Birōdo	Velvet	34,70,52	#224634
虫襖	Mushi'ao	Insect screen	45,68,54	#2D4436	藍海松茶	Aimirucha	Indigo Codium fragile seaweed brown	46,55,46	#2E372E
沈香茶	Tonocha	Aloeswood brown	90,100,87	#5A6457	水浅葱	Mizu'asagi	Pale green onion	116,159,141	#749F8D
青磁色	Seiji-iro	Celadon color	129,156,139	#819C8B	青碧	Seiheki	Blue-green	58,105,96	#3A6960
錆鉄御納戸	Sabitetsuonando	Rusty storeroom	58,64,59	#3A403B	鉄色	Tetsu-iro	Iron color	43,55,51	#2B3733
御召茶	Omeshicha	Silk crepe brown	53,78,75	#354E4B	高麗納戸	Kōrainando	Goryeo storeroom	32,56,56	#203838

=== Blue/blue violet series ===
Name	Romanized	English	RGB	Hex triplet	Name	Romanized	English	RGB	Hex triplet
湊鼠	Minatonezumi	Harbor rat	117,125,117	#757D75	青鈍	Aonibi	Dull blue	79,73,68	#4F4944
鉄御納戸	Tetsuonando	Iron storage	43,55,54	#2B3736	水色	Mizu-iro	Aqua Blue color	134,171,165	#86ABA5
錆浅葱	Sabiasagi	Rusted light-blue	106,127,122	#6A7F7A	瓶覗	Kamenozoki	Inside of a bottle	198,194,182	#C6C2B6
浅葱色	Asagi-iro	Light blue color	72,146,155	#48929B	新橋色	Shinbashi-iro	"New Bridge" color	0,108,127	#006C7F
錆御納戸	Sabionando	Rusty storage	69,88,89	#455859	藍鼠	Ainezumi	Mousy indigo	92,84,78	#5C544E
藍色	Ai-iro	Indigo color	38,67,72	#264348	御納戸色	Onando-iro	Onando color	54,65,65	#364141
花浅葱	Hanaasagi	Light blue flower	29,105,124	#1D697C	千草色	Chigusa-iro	Thousand herb color	49,117,137	#317589
舛花色	Masuhana-iro	Ichikawa family crest blue	77,100,108	#4D646C	縹	Hanada	Light blue silk	4,79,103	#044F67
熨斗目花色	Noshimehana-iro	Iron head flower color	52,77,86	#344D56	御召御納戸	Omeshionando	Kimono storage	61,76,81	#3D4C51
空色	Sora-iro	Sky Blue color	77,143,172	#4D8FAC	黒橡	Kurotsurubami	Black chestnut oak	37,35,33	#252321
群青色	Gunjō-iro	Ultramarine color	93,140,174	#5D8CAE	紺	Kon	Dark blue	25,34,54	#192236
褐色	Kachi-iro	Coarse wool color	24,27,38	#181B26	瑠璃色	Ruri-iro	Lapis lazuli color	31,71,136	#1F4788
紺青色	Konjō-iro	Prussian blue color	0,49,113	#003171	瑠璃紺	Rurikon	Dark blue lapis lazuli	27,41,75	#1B294B
紅碧	Benimidori	Stained red	120,119,155	#78779B	紺桔梗	Konkikyō	Navy blue bellflower	25,31,69	#191F45
藤鼠	Fujinezumi	Mousy wisteria	118,105,128	#766980	紅掛花色	Benikakehana-iro	Safflower color	90,79,116	#5A4F74
藤色	Fuji-iro	Wisteria color	137,114,158	#89729E	二藍	Futa'ai	Dark indigo	97,78,110	#614E6E

=== Violet series ===
Name	Romanized	English	RGB	Hex triplet	Name	Romanized	English	RGB	Hex triplet
藤紫	Fujimurasaki	Wisteria purple	135,95,154	#875F9A	桔梗色	Kikyō-iro	Bellflower color	93,63,106	#5D3F6A
紫苑色	Shion-iro	Tatarian aster color	151,110,154	#976E9A	滅紫	Messhi	Poppy purple	63,49,58	#3F313A
紫紺	Shikon	Blue-violet	43,32,40	#2B2028	深紫	Kokimurasaki	Deep purple	58,36,59	#3A243B
薄色	Usu-iro	Thin color	168,124,160	#A87CA0	半色	Hashita-iro	Half color	141,96,140	#8D608C
菫色	Sumire-iro	Violet color	91,50,86	#5B3256	紫	Murasaki	Purple	79,40,75	#4F284B
黒紅	Kurobeni	Dark red	35,25,30	#23191E	菖蒲色	Ayame-iro	Iris color	118,53,104	#763568
紅藤	Benifuji	Red wisteria	187,119,150	#BB7796	杜若	Kakitsubata	Rabbit-ear iris	73,30,60	#491E3C
鳩羽鼠	Hatobanezumi	Dove feather grey	117,93,91	#755D5B	葡萄鼠	Budōnezumi	Grape mouse	99,66,75	#63424B
蒲萄	Ebizome	Vine grape	109,43,80	#6D2B50	藤煤竹	Fujisusutake	Wisteria and burnt-bamboo	77,59,60	#4D3B3C
牡丹	Bōtan	Tree peony	164,52,93	#A4345D	梅紫	Umemurasaki	Plum purple	143,65,85	#8F4155
似せ紫	Nisemurasaki	Fake purple	67,36,42	#43242A	紫鳶	Murasakitobi	Purple kite	81,44,49	#512C31
蘇芳	Su'ō	Sappanwood	126,38,57	#7E2639	桑染	Kuwazome	Mulberry dye	89,41,44	#59292C
紅消鼠	Benikeshinezumi	Vanishing red mouse	68,49,46	#44312E					

=== Achromatic series ===
Name	Romanized	English	RGB	Hex triplet	Name	Romanized	English	RGB	Hex triplet
白練	Shironeri	Unbleached silk	255,221,202	#FFDDCA	白鼠	Shironezumi	White mouse	185,161,147	#B9A193
銀鼠	Ginnezumi	Silver-grey	151,134,124	#97867C	素鼠	Sunezumi	Plain mouse	110,95,87	#6E5F57
丼鼠	Dobunezumi	Brown rat grey	75,60,57	#4B3C39	藍墨茶	Aisumicha	Indigo ink brown	57,52,50	#393432
檳榔子染	Binrōjizome	Betel nut-dyed	53,41,37	#352925	墨色	Sumi-iro	Ink color	39,34,31	#27221F
黒色	Kokushoku	Black	23,20,18	#171412	藍白	Aijiro	Indigo white	235, 246, 247	#EBF6F7

== Bibliography ==
- Hibi, Sadao; Fukuda, Kunio (2000). The Colors of Japan. Kodansha International. ISBN 978-4-7700-2536-4.
- Nagasaki, Seiki (2001). Nihon no dentoshoku: Sono shikimei to shikicho (in Japanese). Seigensha. ISBN 4-916094-53-0.
- Nihon Shikisai Gakkai (1985). Shinpen shikisai kagaku handobukku (in Japanese). Tokyo Daigaku Shuppankai. ISBN 4-13-061000-7.
- https://color-term.com/traditional-color-of-japan/
