= ColorZilla =

- Developer(s): Alex Sirota
- Stable release: 2.8 / July 31, 2012; 12 years ago
- Operating system: Cross-platform
- Type: Web browser, Web development
- License: Freeware, Proprietary
- Website: www.colorzilla.com

ColorZilla is a Google Chrome and Mozilla extension that assists web developers and graphic designers with color related and other tasks.

ColorZilla allows getting a color reading from any point in the browser, quickly adjusting this color and pasting it into another program, such as Photoshop.

The extension allows zooming Web pages and measuring distances between any two points on the page. The built-in palette browser allows choosing colors from pre-defined color sets and saving the most used colors in custom palettes. DOM spying features allow getting various information about DOM elements.

== Features ==
- Multiplatform - Microsoft Windows, Linux, and Mac OS X
- Eyedropper
- Color picker
- Page zooming
- Palette viewer and editor (GIMP compatible)
- History and Favorites palette
- Page Pan
- Displays element information (tag name, class, id, size)
- Outline DOM elements
- RGB, HSV, and HTML colors support
- Auto copy
- Launch DOM Inspector
- Distance measurements

== See also ==
- Firefox
- Color tool
