= Color picker =

Graphical user interface element

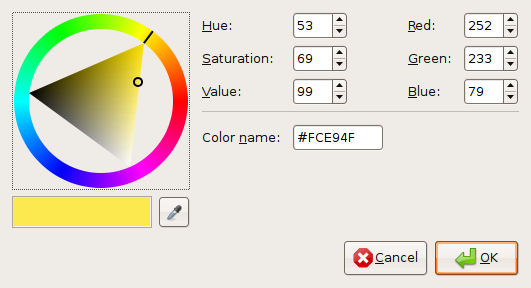
A screenshot of the GTK+ 2 color picker.

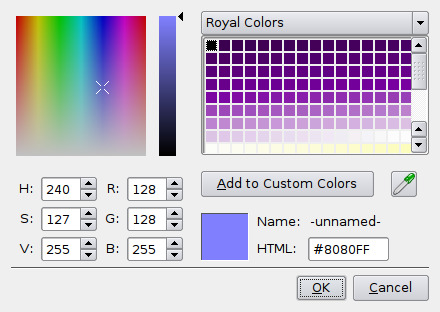
A screenshot of the Qt color picker.

GIMP color picker.

A color picker (American English) or colour picker (British and Commonwealth English; see spelling differences) [also colo(u)r chooser or colo(u)r tool] is a graphical user interface widget, usually found within graphics software or online, used to select colors and, in some cases, to create color schemes (the color picker might be more sophisticated than the palette included with the program). Operating systems such as Microsoft Windows or macOS have a system color picker, which can be used by third-party programs (e.g., Adobe Photoshop).

== History ==
The concept of color pickers dates back to the early days of computer graphics and digital design. Early versions were rudimentary, often featuring basic color palettes and limited functionality. One of the first drawing programs to include a color picker was SketchPad (also referred to as LisaSketch), designed by Bill Atkinson in 1983 to showcase LisaGraf's capabilities. It used a black and white pattern system, using dithering to create the illusion of color depth.

With the increased popularity of personal computers with color graphics, there soon came software similar to SketchPad that supported more than two colors, like Broderbund's Dazzle Draw for the Apple II or Electronic Arts' Deluxe Paint. However, the color pickers present in those programs relied on indexed colors. Color pickers, resembling ones used in modern software with support for direct, 24-bit color, appeared soon after the release of the Macintosh II, with the release of programs like Adobe Photoshop and Corel Painter.

As the increase of color depth allowed the choice of significantly more colors, the shape and form of color pickers started to diverge. For example, Adobe Photoshop used a hue-saturation color wheel with a slider for brightness in version 0.63, later on switching to a rectangular design accompanied by a hue slider. Corel Painter pioneered the triangular saturation and brightness picker with a hue ring around it, aiming to better represent the continuity of the hue spectrum and the relationship between saturation and brightness.

== Purpose ==
A color picker is used to select and adjust color values. In graphic design and image editing, users typically choose colors via an interface with a visual representation of a color—organized with quasi-perceptually-relevant hue, saturation and lightness dimensions (HSL) – instead of keying in alphanumeric text values. Because color appearance depends on comparison of neighboring colors (see color vision), many interfaces attempt to clarify the relationships between colors.

== Interface ==
Color tools can vary in their interface. Some may use sliders, buttons, text boxes for color values, or direct manipulation. Often a two-dimensional square is used to create a range of color values (such as lightness and saturation) that can be clicked on or selected in some other manner. Drag and drop, color droppers, and various other forms of interfaces are commonly used as well.

Usually, color values are also displayed numerically, so they can be precisely remembered and keyed-in later, such as three values of 0-255 representing red, green, and blue, respectively.

=== Eyedropper ===
The eyedropper is a tool present in most color pickers and graphics software that allows a user to read a color at a specific point in an image, or position on a display. This enables the color to be transferred to other applications particularly quickly.

Modern implementations of eyedropper tools are also available as browser extensions, allowing users to pick colors directly from web pages, such as in Google Chrome and Microsoft Edge.

== Working ==
A color picker has two main parts, first a color slider and second a color canvas. The color slider has a linear or radial gradient of the seven rainbow colors i.e. Violet, Indigo, Blue, Green, Yellow, Orange and Red. It allows one to choose any of the seven primary colors.

The color value chosen from the color slider instantly reflects in the color canvas. The color canvas is a mixture of two linear color gradients. First a linear gradient of the current chosen color and second a linear gradient of the black color. This mixture of color gradients lets one choose a lighter and darker version of the current chosen color from the color slider.

== See also ==
- Color balance
- Color management
- Color space
- RGB color spaces
