= List of colors (alphabetical) =

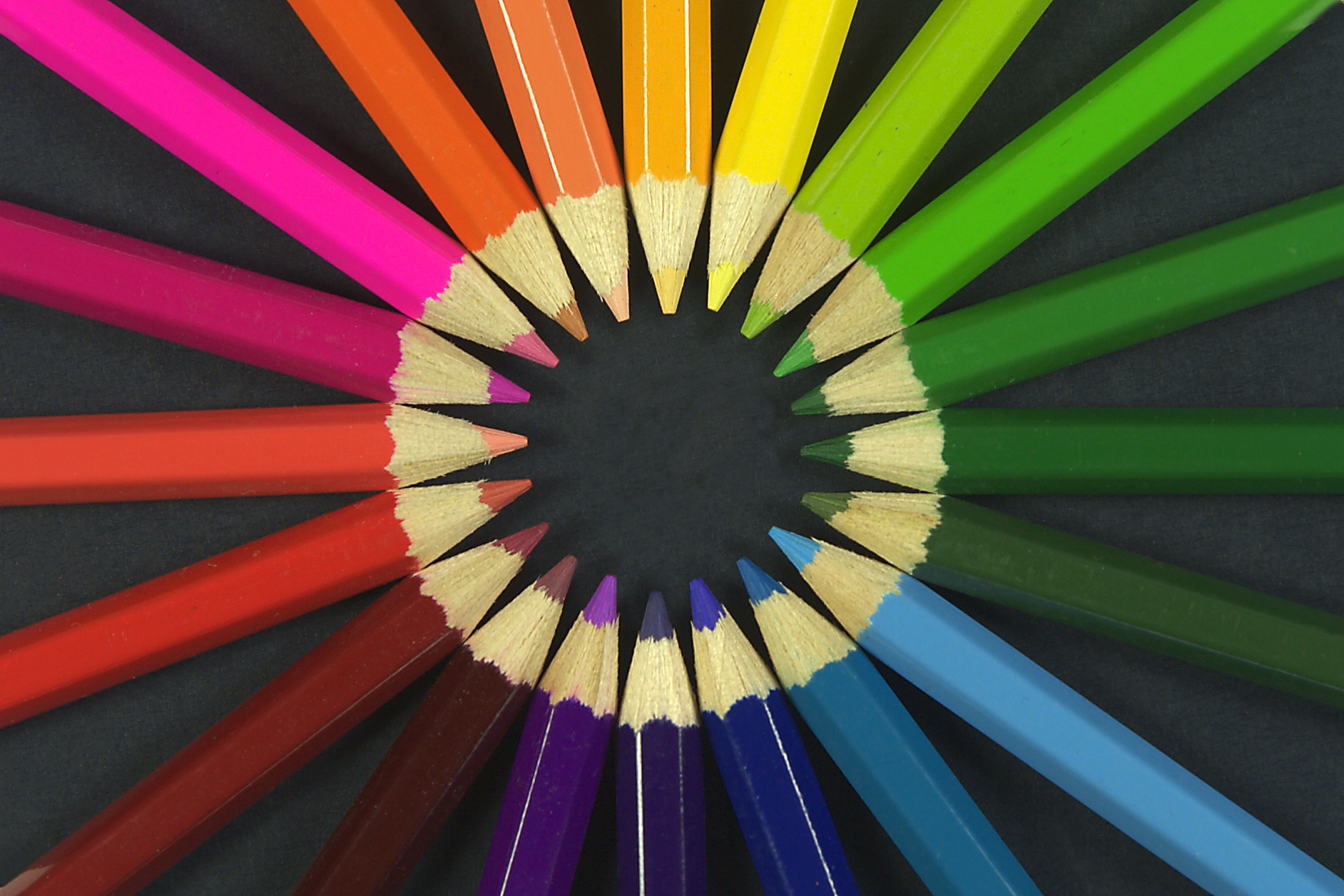
Colors are an important part of the visual arts, fashion, interior design, and many other fields and disciplines

The following list shows a compact version of the colors in the list of colors A–F, G–M, and N–Z articles. The list shows the color swatch and its name. Hovering over the color box shows the HSV, RGB, and #hex values for the color in the tool tip. All values and conversions are in the sRGB color space, which is an inappropriate assumption for some entries.

== RGB color list ==
#FFCCCC	#FFC0C0	#FF9999	#FF8080	#FF6666	#FF4040	#FF3333	#FF0000
#FFE5CC	#FFE0C0	#FFCC99	#FFC080	#FFB266	#FFA040	#FF9933	#FF8000
#FFFFCC	#FFFFC0	#FFFF99	#FFFF80	#FFFF66	#FFFF40	#FFFF33	#FFFF00
#FFFFE5	#FFFFE0	#FFFFCC	#FFFFC0	#FFFFB2	#FFFFA0	#FFFF99	#FFFF80
#E5FFCC	#E0FFC0	#CCFF99	#C0FFA0	#B2FF66	#A0FF40	#99FF33	#80FF00
#CCFFCC	#C0FFC0	#99FF99	#80FF80	#66FF66	#40FF40	#33FF33	#00FF00
#E5FFE5	#E0FFE0	#CCFFCC	#C0FFC0	#B2FFB2	#A0FFA0	#99FF99	#80FF80
#CCE5CC	#C0E0C0	#99CC99	#80C080	#66B266	#40A040	#339933	#008000
#CCFFE5	#C0FFE0	#99FFCC	#80FFC0	#66FFB2	#40FFA0	#33FF99	#00FF80
#CCFFFF	#C0FFFF	#99FFFF	#80FFFF	#66FFFF	#40FFFF	#33FFFF	#00FFFF
#E5FFFF	#E0FFFF	#CCFFFF	#C0FFFF	#B2FFFF	#A0FFFF	#99FFFF	#80FFFF
#CCE5E5	#C0E0E0	#99CCCC	#80C0C0	#66B2B2	#40A0A0	#339999	#008080
#CCE5FF	#C0E0FF	#99CCFF	#80C0FF	#66B2FF	#40A0FF	#3399FF	#0080FF
#CCCCFF	#C0C0FF	#9999FF	#8080FF	#6666FF	#4040FF	#3333FF	#0000FF
#CCCCE5	#C0C0E0	#9999CC	#8080C0	#6666B2	#4040A0	#333399	#000080
#E5E5FF	#E0E0FF	#CCCCFF	#C0C0FF	#B2B2FF	#A0A0FF	#9999FF	#8080FF
#E5CCFF	#E0C0FF	#CC99FF	#C080FF	#B266FF	#A040FF	#9933FF	#8000FF
#E5CCE5	#E0C0E0	#CC99CC	#C080C0	#B266B2	#A040A0	#993399	#800080
#FFCCFF	#FFC0FF	#FF99FF	#FF80FF	#FF66FF	#FF40FF	#FF33FF	#FF00FF
#FFE5FF	#FFE0FF	#FFCCFF	#FFC0FF	#FFB2FF	#FFA0FF	#FF99FF	#FF80FF
#FFCCE5	#FFC0E0	#FF99CC	#FF80C0	#FF66B2	#FF40A0	#FF3399	#FF0080
#FFE5E5	#FFE0E0	#FFCCCC	#FFC0C0	#FFB2B2	#FFA0A0	#FF9999	#FF8080
#E5CCCC	#E0C0C0	#CC9999	#C08080	#B26666	#A04040	#993333	#800000
#E5E5CC	#E0E0C0	#CCCC99	#C0C080	#B2B266	#A0A040	#999933	#808000
#E5E5E5	#E0E0E0	#CCCCCC	#C0C0C0	#B2B2B2	#A0A0A0	#999999	#808080

#FF0000	#CC0000	#C00000	#990000	#800000	#660000	#400000	#330000
#FF8000	#CC6600	#C06000	#994C00	#804000	#663300	#402000	#331900
#FFFF00	#CCCC00	#C0C000	#999900	#808000	#666600	#404000	#333300
#FFFF80	#CCCC66	#C0C060	#99994C	#808040	#666633	#404020	#333319
#80FF00	#66CC00	#60C000	#4C9900	#408000	#336600	#204000	#193300
#00FF00	#00CC00	#00C000	#009900	#008000	#006600	#004000	#003300
#80FF80	#66CC66	#60C060	#4C994C	#408040	#336633	#204020	#193319
#008000	#006600	#006000	#004C00	#004000	#003300	#002000	#001900
#00FF80	#00CC66	#00C060	#00994C	#008040	#006633	#004020	#003319
#00FFFF	#00CCCC	#00C0C0	#009999	#008080	#006666	#004040	#003333
#80FFFF	#66CCCC	#60C0C0	#4C9999	#408080	#336666	#204040	#193333
#008080	#006666	#006060	#004C4C	#004040	#003333	#002020	#001919
#0080FF	#0066CC	#0060C0	#004C99	#004080	#003366	#002040	#001933
#0000FF	#0000CC	#0000C0	#000099	#000080	#000066	#000040	#000033
#000080	#000066	#000060	#00004C	#000040	#000033	#000020	#000019
#8080FF	#6666CC	#6060C0	#4C4C99	#404080	#333366	#202040	#191933
#8000FF	#6600CC	#6000C0	#4C0099	#400080	#330066	#200040	#190033
#800080	#660066	#600060	#4C004C	#400040	#330033	#200020	#190019
#FF00FF	#CC00CC	#C000C0	#990099	#800080	#660066	#400040	#330033
#FF80FF	#CC66CC	#C060C0	#994C99	#804080	#663366	#402040	#331933
#FF0080	#CC0066	#C00060	#99004C	#800040	#660033	#400020	#330019
#FF8080	#CC6666	#C06060	#994C4C	#804040	#663333	#402020	#331919
#800000	#660000	#600000	#4C0000	#400000	#330000	#200000	#190000
#808000	#666600	#606000	#4C4C00	#404000	#333300	#202000	#191900
#808080	#666666	#606060	#4C4C4C	#404040	#333333	#202020	#191919

== List of colors ==
=== A ===
Absolute Zero
#0048BA

Acid green
#B0BF1A

Aero
#7CB9E8

African violet
#B284BE

Air superiority blue
#72A0C1

Alabaster
#F2F0E6

Alice blue
#F0F8FF

Alizarin
#DB2D43

Alloy orange
#C46210

Almond
#EFDECD

Amaranth
#E52B50

Amaranth deep purple
#9F2B68

Amaranth pink
#F19CBB

Amaranth purple
#AB274F

Amazon
#3B7A57

Amber
#FFBF00

Amber (SAE/ECE)
#FF7E00

Amethyst
#9966CC

Amethyst (Crayola)
#64609A

Android green
#3DDC84

Antique brass
#CD9575

Antique bronze
#665D1E

Antique fuchsia
#915C83

Antique ruby
#841B2D

Antique white
#FAEBD7

Apricot
#FBCEB1

Aqua
#00FFFF

Aquamarine
#7FFFD4

Aquamarine (Crayola)
#95E0E8

Arctic lime
#D0FF14

Artichoke green
#4B6F44

Artist's purple
#C71585

Arylide yellow
#E9D66B

Ash gray
#B2BEB5

Asparagus
#7BA05B

Atomic tangerine
#FF9966

Aureolin
#FDEE00

Aztec gold
#C39953

Azure
#007FFF

Azure (X11/web color)
#F0FFFF

=== B ===
Baby blue
#89CFF0

Baby blue eyes
#A1CAF1

Baby pink
#F4C2C2

Baby powder
#FEFEFA

Baker-Miller pink
#FF91AF

Banana Mania
#FAE7B5

Barbie pink
#E0218A

Barn red
#7C0A02

Battleship gray
#848482

Beau blue
#BCD4E6

Beaver
#9F8170

Beige
#F5F5DC

Berry parfait
#A43482

B'dazzled blue
#2E5894

Big dip o’ruby
#9C2542

Big Foot Feet
#E88E5A

Bisque
#FFE4C4

Bister (Bistre)
#3D2B1F

Bister brown
(Bistre brown)
#967117

Bitter lemon
#CAE00D

Bittersweet
#FE6F5E

Bittersweet shimmer
#BF4F51

Black
#000000

Black bean
#3D0C02

Black coral
#54626F

Black olive
#3B3C36

Black Shadows
#BFAFB2

Blanched almond
#FFEBCD

Blast-off bronze
#A57164

Bleu de France
#318CE7

Blizzard blue
#50BFE6

Blood red
#660000

Blue
#0000FF

Blue (Crayola)
#1F75FE

Blue (Munsell)
#0093AF

Blue (NCS)
#0087BD

Blue (Pantone)
#0018A8

Blue (pigment)
#333399

Blue bell
#A2A2D0

Blue-gray
#6699CC

Blue-gray (Crayola)
#C8C8CD

Blue-green
#0D98BA

Blue jeans
#5DADEC

Blue Ribbon
#0B10A2

Blue sapphire
#126180

Blue-violet
#8A2BE2

Blue yonder
#5072A7

Blueberry
#4F86F7

Bluetiful
#3C69E7

Blush
#DE5D83

Bole
#79443B

Bone
#E3DAC9

Booger Buster
#DDE26A

Brick red
#CB4154

Bright green
#66FF00

Bright lilac
#D891EF

Bright maroon
#C32148

Bright navy blue
#1974D2

Bright pink
#FF007F

Bright turquoise
#08E8DE

Bright yellow (Crayola)
#FFAA1D

Brilliant rose
#E667CE

Brilliant green 1621
#009966

Brink pink
#FB607F

British racing green
#004225

Bronze
#CD7F32

Brown
#964B00

Brown (crayola)
#AF593E

Brown (CMY)
#4B3621

Brown (web)
#A52A2A

Brown sugar
#AF6E4D

Bud green
#7BB661

Buff
#F0DC82

Burgundy
#800020

Burlywood
#DEB887

Burnished brown
#A17A74

Burnt orange
#CC5500

Burnt sienna
#E97451

Burnt umber
#8A3324

Byzantine
#BD33A4

Byzantium
#702963

=== C ===
Cadet
#536872

Cadet blue
#5F9EA0

Cadet gray
#91A3B0

Cadmium green
#006B3C

Cadmium orange
#ED872D

Cadmium red
#E30022

Cadmium yellow
#FFF600

Café au lait
#A67B5B

Café Noir
#4B3621

Cambridge blue
#A3C1AD

Camel
#C19A6B

Cameo pink
#EFBBCC

Canary
#FFFF99

Canary yellow
#FFEF00

Candy apple red
#FF0800

Candy pink
#E4717A

Caramel
#65350F

Cardinal
#C41E3A

Caribbean green
#00CC99

Carmine
#960018

Carnation pink
#FFA6C9

Carolina blue
#99BADD

Carrot orange
#ED9121

Catawba
#703642

Cedar Chest
#C95A49

Cedar Chest
#CA3435

Celadon
#ACE1AF

Celeste
#B2FFFF

Cerise
#DE3163

Cerulean
#007BA7

Cerulean blue
#2A52BE

Cerulean frost
#6D9BC3

Cerulean (Crayola)
#1DACD6

Champagne
#FAD6A5

Champagne pink
#F1DDCF

Charcoal
#36454F

Charleston green
#232B2B

Charm pink
#E68FAC

Chartreuse
#7FFF00

Cherry blossom pink
#FFB7C5

Chestnut
#954535

China pink
#DE6FA1

Chinese red
#AA381E

Chinese violet
#856088

Chocolate (traditional)
#7B3F00

Chocolate (web)
#D2691E

Cinereous
#98817B

Cinnamon Satin
#CD607E

Citrine
#E4D00A

Citron
#9FA91F

Claret
#7F1734

Cloud
#EFF1FE

Cobalt blue
#0047AB

Cocoa brown
#D2691E

Coconut
#965A3E

Coffee
#6F4E37

Columbia Blue
#9BDDFF

Congo pink
#F88379

Connor's Lakefront
#175A6C

Cool gray
#8C92AC

Copper
#B87333

Copper penny
#AD6F69

Copper red
#CB6D51

Copper rose
#996666

Coquelicot
#FF3800

Coral
#FF7F50

Coral pink
#F88379

Cordovan
#893F45

Cornflower blue (web)
#6495ED

Cornflower blue (Crayola)
#93CCEA

Cornsilk
#FFF8DC

Cosmic cobalt
#2E2D88

Cosmic latte
#FFF8E7

Coyote brown
#81613C

Cotton candy
#FFBCD9

Cream
#FFFDD0

Crimson
#DC143C

Crimson (UA)
#9E1B32

Cultured
#F5F5F5

Cyan
#00FFFF

Cyber grape
#58427C

Cyber yellow
#FFD300

Cyclamen
#F56FA1

=== D ===
Dandelion
#DDF719

Dark blue
#00008B

Dark blue-gray
#666699

Dark brown
#654321

Dark byzantium
#5D3954

Dark cyan
#008B8B

Dark electric blue
#536878

Dark Fuchsia
#A00955

Dark goldenrod
#B8860B

Dark gray (X11)
#A9A9A9

Dark green
#013220

Dark green (X11)
#006400

Dark jungle green
#1A2421

Dark khaki
#BDB76B

Dark lava
#483C32

Dark liver
#534B4F

Dark magenta
#8B008B

Dark midnight blue
#003366

Dark moss green
#4A5D23

Dark olive green
#556B2F

Dark orange
#FF8C00

Dark orchid
#9932CC

Dark pastel green
#03C03C

Dark purple
#301934

Dark raspberry
#872657

Dark red
#8B0000

Dark salmon
#E9967A

Dark sea green
#8FBC8F

Dark sienna
#3C1414

Dark sky blue
#8CBED6

Dark slate blue
#483D8B

Dark slate gray
#2F4F4F

Dark spring green
#177245

Dark tan
#918151

Dark turquoise
#00CED1

Dark vanilla
#D1BEA8

Dark violet
#9400D3

Dartmouth green
#00703C

Davy's gray
#555555

Deep cerise
#DA3287

Deep champagne
#FAD6A5

Deep chestnut
#B94E48

Deep fuchsia
#C154C1

Deep jungle green
#004B49

Deep lemon
#F5C71A

Deep mauve
#D473D4

Deep pink
#FF1493

Deep sky blue
#00BFFF

Deep Space Sparkle
#4A646C

Deep Taupe
#7E5E60

Denim
#1560BD

Denim Blue
#2243B6

Desert
#C19A6B

Desert sand
#EDC9AF

Dim gray
#696969

Dingy Dungeon
#C53151

Dirt
#9B7653

Dodger blue
#1E90FF

Dogwood rose
#D71868

Duke blue
#00009C

Dutch white
#EFDFBB

=== E ===
Earth yellow
#E1A95F

Ebony
#555D50

Ecru
#C2B280

Eerie black
#1B1B1B

Eggplant
#614051

Eggshell
#F0EAD6

Egyptian blue
#1034A6

Electric blue
#7DF9FF

Electric indigo
#6F00FF

Electric lime
#CCFF00

Electric purple
#BF00FF

Electric violet
#8F00FF

Emerald
#50C878

Eminence
#6C3082

English lavender
#B48395

English red
#AB4B52

English vermillion
#CC474B

English violet
#563C5C

Erin
#00FF40

Eton blue
#96C8A2

Eucalyptus
#44D7A8

Extreme violet
#9F00FF

=== F ===
Fallow
#C19A6B

Falu red
#801818

Fandango
#B53389

Fandango pink
#DE5285

Fashion fuchsia
#F400A1

Fawn
#E5AA70

Feldgrau
#4D5D53

Fern green
#4F7942

Field drab
#6C541E

Fiery rose
#FF5470

Firebrick
#B22222

Fire engine red
#CE2029

Fire opal
#E95C4B

Flame
#E25822

Flamingo
#FC8EAC

Flax
#EEDC82

Flirt
#A2006D

Floral white
#FFFAF0

Fluorescent blue
#15F4EE

Forest green (Crayola)
#5FA777

Forest green (traditional)
#014421

Forest green (web)
#228B22

French beige
#A67B5B

French bister
(French bistre)
#856D4D

French blue
#0072BB

French fuchsia
#FD3F92

French lilac
#86608E

French lime
#9EFD38

French mauve
#D473D4

French pink
#FD6C9E

French raspberry
#C72C48

French rose
#F64A8A

French sky blue
#77B5FE

French violet
#8806CE

Frostbite
#E936A7

Fuchsia
#FF00FF

Fuchsia (Crayola)
#C154C1

Fuchsia purple
#CC397B

Fuchsia rose
#C74375

Fulvous
#E48400

Fuzzy Wuzzy
#CC6666

Fuzzy Wuzzy
#87421F

=== G ===
Gainsboro
#DCDCDC

Gamboge
#E49B0F

Garnet
#733635

Generic viridian
#007F66

Ghost white
#F8F8FF

Glaucous
#6082B6

Glossy grape
#AB92B3

GO green
#00AB66

Gold
#A57C00

Gold (metallic)
#D4AF37

Gold (web) (Golden)
#FFD700

Gold (Crayola)
#E6BE8A

Gold Fusion
#85754E

Golden brown
#996515

Golden poppy
#FCC200

Golden yellow
#FFDF00

Goldenrod
#DAA520

Granite gray
#676767

Granny Smith apple
#A8E4A0

Grape
#6F2DA8

Gray (web)
#808080

Gray (X11)
#BEBEBE

Green
#00FF00

Green (Crayola)
#1CAC78

Green frog
#00A86B

Green (HTML/CSS color)
#008000

Green (Munsell)
#00A877

Green (NCS)
#009F6B

Green (Pantone)
#00AD43

Green (pigment)
#00A550

Green (RYB)
#66B032

Green-blue
#1164B4

Green-blue (Crayola)
#2887C8

Green-cyan
#009966

Green Lizard
#A7F432

Green Sheen
#6EAEA1

Green-yellow
#ADFF2F

Green-yellow (Crayola)
#F0E891

Grullo
#A99A86

Gunmetal
#2a3439

=== H ===
Han blue
#446CCF

Han purple
#5218FA

Hansa yellow
#E9D66B

Harlequin
#3FFF00

Harvest gold
#DA9100

Heat Wave
#FF7A00

Heather
#9E7BB5

Heliotrope
#DF73FF

Heliotrope gray
#AA98A9

Hollywood cerise
#F400A1

Honeydew
#F0FFF0

Honolulu blue
#006DB0

Hooker's green
#49796B

Hot fuchsia
#FF00C6

Hot magenta
#FF1DCE

Hot pink
#FF69B4

Hunter green
#355E3B

=== I ===
Iceberg
#71A6D2

Iced tea
#923C01

Icterine
#FCF75E

Illuminating emerald
#319177

Imperial
#602F6B

Imperial blue
#002395

Imperial red
#ED2939

Inchworm
#B2EC5D

Independence
#4C516D

India green
#138808

Indian red
#CD5C5C

Indian yellow
#E3A857

Indigo
#6A5DFF

Indigo (color wheel)
#4000FF

Indigo (Crayola)
#4F69C6

Indigo (web color)
#4B0082

Indigo dye
#00416A

International orange (aerospace)
#FF4F00

International orange (engineering)
#BA160C

International orange (Golden Gate Bridge)
#C0362C

Iridescent Indigo
#3C32CD

Iris
#5A4FCF

Iron Gray
#555D61

Iron Indigo
#184FA1

Irresistible
#B3446C

Isabelline
#F4F0EC

Italian sky blue
#B2FFFF

Ivory
#FFFFF0

=== J ===
Jade
#00A86B

Japanese carmine
#9D2933

Japanese indigo
#264348

Japanese violet
#5B3256

Jasmine
#F8DE7E

Jazzberry jam
#A50B5E

Jet
#343434

Jonquil
#F4CA16

June bud
#BDDA57

Jungle green
#29AB87

=== K ===
Kelly green
#4CBB17

Kenyan copper
#7C1C05

Keppel
#3AB09E

Key lime
#E8F48C

Khaki (web) (Khaki)
#C3B091

Khaki (X11) (Light khaki)
#F0E68C

Kobe
#882D17

Kobi
#E79FC4

Kobicha
#6B4423

Kombu green
#354230

KSU Purple
#512888

=== L ===
La Salle green
#087830

Languid lavender
#D6CADD

Lanzones
#E0BC5B

Lapis lazuli
#26619C

Laser Lemon
#FFFF66

Laurel green
#A9BA9D

Lava
#CF1020

Lavender (floral)
#B57EDC

Lavender (web)
#E6E6FA

Lavender blue
#CCCCFF

Lavender gray
#C4C3D0

Lavender indigo
#9457EB

Lavender magenta
#EE82EE

Lavender mist
#E6E6FA

Lavender purple
#967BB6

Lavender rose
#FBA0E3

Lemon
#FFF700

Lemon chiffon
#FFFACD

Lemon curry
#CCA01D

Lemon glacier
#FDFF00

Lemon iced tea
#BD3000

Lemon lime
#E3FF00

Lemon lime
#5CFF67

Lemon meringue
#F6EABE

Lemon yellow
#FFF44F

Lemon yellow (Crayola)
#FFFF9F

Licorice
#1A1110

Light brown
#B5651D

Light carmine pink
#E66771

Light chocolate cosmos
#551F2F

Light cobalt blue
#88ACE0

Light cornflower blue
#93CCEA

Light crimson
#F56991

Light cyan
#E0FFFF

Light French beige
#C8AD7F

Light fuchsia pink
#F984EF

Light gold
#B29700

Light grayish magenta
#CC99CC

Light medium orchid
#D39BCB

Light Moss Green
#ADDFAD

Light orchid
#E6A8D7

Light pastel purple
#B19CD9

Light periwinkle
#C5CBE1

Light red
#FFCCCB

Light red ocher (Light red ochre)
#E97451

Light salmon pink
#FF9999

Light sea green
#20B2AA

Light silver
#D8D8D8

Light Thulian pink
#E68FAC

Lilac
#C8A2C8

Lilac Luster
#AE98AA

Lime (color wheel)
#BFFF00

Lime (web) (X11 green)
#00FF00

Lime green
#32CD32

Limerick
#9DC209

Lincoln green
#195905

Linen
#FAF0E6

Lion
#C19A6B

Liseran purple
#DE6FA1

Little boy blue
#6CA0DC

Little girl pink
#F8B9D4

Liver
#674C47

Liver (dogs)
#B86D29

Liver (organ)
#6C2E1F

Liver chestnut
#987456

Livid
#6699CC

Lotion
#FEFDFA

Lotion blue
#15F2FD

Lotion pink
#ECCFCF

Lumber
#FFE4CD

Lust
#E62020

=== M ===
Maastricht Blue
#001C3D

Macaroni and Cheese
#FFBD88

Madder Lake
#CC3336

Magenta
#FF00FF

Magenta (Pantone)
#D0417E

Magic Mint
#AAF0D1

Mahogany
#C04000

Maize
#FBEC5D

Maize (Crayola)
#F2C649

Majorelle Blue
#6050DC

Malachite
#0BDA51

Manatee
#979AAA

Mandarin
#F37A48

Mango
#FDBE02

Mango green
#96FF00

Mango Tango
#FF8243

Mantis
#74C365

Mardi Gras
#880085

Marigold
#EAA221

Maroon (Crayola)
#C32148

Maroon (HTML/CSS)
#800000

Maroon (X11)
#B03060

Mauve
#E0B0FF

Mauve taupe
#915F6D

Mauveine
#8D029B

Mauvelous
#EF98AA

Maximum Blue
#47ABCC

Maximum Blue Green
#30BFBF

Maximum Blue Purple
#ACACE6

Maximum Green
#5E8C31

Maximum Green Yellow
#D9E650

Maximum orange
#FF5B00

Maximum Purple
#733380

Maximum pink
#F6A5F2

Maximum red
#D92121

Maximum Red Purple
#A63A79

Maximum violet
#892F77

Maximum yellow
#FAFA37

Maximum yellow red
#F2BA49

May green
#4C9141

Maya blue
#73C2FB

Medium aquamarine
#66DDAA

Medium blue
#0000CD

Medium candy apple red
#E2062C

Medium carmine
#AF4035

Medium champagne
#F3E5AB

Medium electric blue
#035096

Medium green
#037949

Medium jungle green
#1C352D

Medium lavender magenta
#DDA0DD

Medium orange
#FF7802

Medium orchid
#BA55D3

Medium Persian blue
#0067A5

Medium pink
#FE6E9F

Medium purple
#9370DB

Medium red
#B10304

Medium red-violet
#BB3385

Medium ruby
#AA4069

Medium sea green
#3CB371

Medium sky blue
#80DAEB

Medium slate blue
#7B68EE

Medium spring bud
#C9DC87

Medium spring green
#00FA9A

Medium taupe
#674C47

Medium turquoise
#48D1CC

Medium Tuscan red
#79443B

Medium vermilion
#D9603B

Medium violet
#65315F

Medium violet-red
#C71585

Medium yellow
#FFE302

Mellow apricot
#F8B878

Mellow yellow
#F8DE7E

Melon
#FDBCB4

Melon (Crayola)
#FEBAAD

Menthol
#C1F9A2

Metallic blue
#32527B

Metallic bronze
#A97142

Metallic brown
#AC4313

Metallic gold
#D3AF37

Metallic green
#296E01

Metallic orange
#DA680F

Metallic pink
#EDA6C4

Metallic red
#A62C2B

Metallic Seaweed
#0A7E8C

Metallic silver
#A8A9AD

Metallic Sunburst
#9C7C38

Metallic violet
#5B0A91

Metallic yellow
#FDCC0D

Mexican pink
#E4007C

Microsoft blue
#00A2ED

Microsoft Edge blue
#0078D7

Microsoft green
#7DB700

Microsoft red
#F04E1F

Microsoft yellow
#FDB900

Middle blue
#7ED4E6

Middle blue green
#8DD9CC

Middle blue purple
#8B72BE

Middle gray
#8B8680

Middle green
#4D8C57

Middle green yellow
#ACBF60

Middle purple
#D982B5

Middle red
#E58E73

Middle red purple
#A55353

Middle violet
#8F00FF

Middle yellow
#FFEB00

Middle yellow red
#ECB176

Midnight
#702670

Midnight blue
#191970

Midnight blue
#00468C

Midnight green
(Eagle green)
#004953

Mikado yellow
#FFC40C

Milk
#FDFFF5

Milk chocolate
#84563C

Mimi pink
#FFDAE9

Mindaro
#E3F988

Ming
#36747D

Minion yellow
#F5E050

Mint
#3EB489

Mint cream
#F5FFFA

Mint green
#98FF98

Misty Moss
#BBB477

Misty rose
#FFE4E1

Moccasin
#FAEBD7

Mocha
#BEA493

Mode beige
#967117

Moonstone
#3AA8C1

Moonstone blue
#73A9C2

Mordant red 19
#AE0C00

Morning blue
#8DA399

Moss green
#8A9A5B

Mountain Meadow
#30BA8F

Mountbatten pink
#997A8D

MSU green
#18453B

Mud
#70543E

Mughal green
#306030

Mulberry
#C54B8C

Mulberry (Crayola)
#C8509B

Mummy's Tomb
#828E84

Mustard
#FFDB58

Mustard brown
#CD7A00

Mustard green
#6E6E30

Mustard yellow
#E1AD01

Myrtle green
#317873

Mystic
#D65282

Mystic maroon
#AD4379

Mystic red
#FF5500

=== N ===
Nadeshiko pink
#F6ADC6

Napier green
#2A8000

Naples yellow
#FADA5E

Navajo white
#FFDEAD

Navy blue
#000080

Navy blue (Crayola)
#1974D2

Navy purple
#9457EB

Near violet
#8000FF

Neon blue
#1B03A3

Neon brown
#C3732A

Neon Carrot
#FF9933

Neon cyan
#00FEFC

Neon fuchsia
#FE4164

Neon gold
#CFAA01

Neon gray
#808080

Neon dark green
#008443

Neon green
#139B42

Neon green
#39FF14

Neon pink
#FE347E

Neon purple
#9457EB

Neon red
#FF1818

Neon scarlet
#FF2603

Neon silver
#CCCCCC

Neon tangerine
#F6890A

Neon yellow
#FFF700

New Car
#214FC6

New York pink
#D7837F

Nickel
#727472

Nintendo red
#E4000F

Non-photo blue
#A4DDED

Nyanza
#E9FFDB

=== O ===
Ocean boat blue
#0077BE

Ocher (Ochre)
#CC7722

Office green
#008000

Old burgundy
#43302E

Old gold
#CFB53B

Old heliotrope
#563C5C

Old lace
#FDF5E6

Old lavender
#796878

Old mauve
#673147

Old moss green
#867E36

Old rose
#C08081

Old silver
#848482

Olive
#808000

Olive drab (#3)
#6B8E23

Olive drab #7
#3C341F

Olive green
#B5B35C

Olivine
#9AB973

Olo
#01FFCD

Onyx
#353839

Opal
#A8C3BC

Opera mauve
#B784A7

Orange
#FF6600

Orange (color wheel)
#FF7F00

Orange (Crayola)
#FF7538

Orange (Pantone)
#FF5800

Orange (RYB)
#FB9902

Orange (web)
#FFA500

Orange iced tea
#FF6700

Orange-red (Crayola)
#FF5349

Orange soda
#E74E14

Orange Soda
#FA5B3D

Orange-yellow
#F5BD1F

Orange-yellow (Crayola)
#F8D568

Orchid
#DA70D6

Orchid pink
#F2BDCD

Orchid (Crayola)
#E29CD2

Orioles orange
#FB4F14

Otter brown
#654321

Outer Space
#414A4C

Outer space (Crayola)
#2D383A

Outrageous orange
#FF6E4A

Outrageous orange
#FF6037

Oxblood
#800020

Oxford blue
#002147

Oxley
#6D9A79

OU Crimson red
#990000

=== P ===
Pacific Blue
#1CA9C9

Pakistan green
#006600

Palatinate blue
#273BE2

Palatinate purple
#682860

Pale aqua
#BCD4E6

Pale blue
#AFEEEE

Pale brown
#987654

Pale carmine
#AF4035

Pale cerulean
#9BC4E2

Pale chestnut
#DDADAF

Pale copper
#DA8A67

Pale cornflower blue
#ABCDEF

Pale cyan
#87D3F8

Pale gold
#E6BE8A

Pale goldenrod
#EEE8AA

Pale green
#98FB98

Pale lavender
#DCD0FF

Pale magenta
#F984E5

Pale pink
#FADADD

Pale plum
#DDA0DD

Pale robin egg blue
#96DED1

Pale silver
#C9C0BB

Pale spring bud
#ECEBBD

Pale taupe
#BC987E

Pale turquoise
#AFEEEE

Pale violet
#CC99FF

Pale violet-red
#DB7093

Pansy purple
#78184A

Paolo Veronese green
#009B7D

Papaya whip
#FFEFD5

Paradise pink
#E63E62

Parchment
#F1E9D2

Paris Green
#50C878

Pastel blue
#AEC6CF

Pastel brown
#836953

Pastel gray
#CFCFC4

Pastel green
#77DD77

Pastel magenta
#F49AC2

Pastel orange
#FFB347

Pastel pink
#DEA5A4

Pastel purple
#B39EB5

Pastel red
#FF6961

Pastel violet
#CB99C9

Pastel yellow
#FDFD96

Patriarch
#800080

Payne's gray
#536878

Peach
#FFE5B4

Peach (Crayola)
#FFCBA4

Peach puff
#FFDAB9

Pear
#D1E231

Pearl
#EAE0C8

Pearl Aqua
#88D8C0

Pearly purple
#B768A2

Perano (Infinitely Hot)
#94B1FF

Peridot
#E6E200

Periwinkle
#CCCCFF

Periwinkle (Crayola)
#C3CDE6

Persian blue
#1C39BB

Persian green
#00A693

Persian indigo
#32127A

Persian orange
#D99058

Persian pink
#F77FBE

Persian plum
#701C1C

Persian red
#CC3333

Persian rose
#FE28A2

Persimmon
#EC5800

Peru
#CD853F

Petal
#F5E2E2

Petunia
#470659

Pewter blue
#8BA8B7

Philippine blue
#0038A7

Philippine bronze
#6E3A07

Philippine brown
#5D1916

Philippine gold
#B17304

Philippine golden yellow
#FFDF00

Philippine gray
#8C8C8C

Philippine green
#008543

Philippine indigo

#00416A

Philippine orange
#FF7300

Philippine pink
#FA1A8E

Philippine red
#CE1127

Philippine silver
#B3B3B3

Philippine sky blue
#0066FF

Philippine violet
#81007F

Philippine yellow
#FECB00

Phlox
#DF00FF

Phthalo blue
#000F89

Phthalo green
#123524

Picton blue
#45B1E8

Pictorial carmine
#C30B4E

Piggy pink
#FDDDE6

Pigment violet
#9400D3

Pine green
#01796F

Pine green
#2A2F23

Pineapple
#563C0D

Pink
#FFC0CB

Pink (Pantone)
#D74894

Pink Diamond (Ace Hardware Color)
#F6D6DE

Pink Diamond (Independent Retailers Colors)
#F0D3DC

Pink flamingo
#FC74FD

Pink lace
#FFDDF4

Pink pearl
#E7ACCF

Pink Sherbet
#F78FA7

Pistachio
#93C572

Platinum
#E5E4E2

Plum
#8E4585

Plum (web)
#DDA0DD

Plump Purple
#5946B2

Poison Purple
#7F01FE

Police blue
#374F6B

Polished pine
#5DA493

Pomp and Power
#86608E

Portland Orange
#FF5A36

Powder blue
#B0E0E6

Princeton orange
#FF8F00

Prune
#701C1C

Prussian blue
#003153

Psychedelic purple
#DF00FF

Puce
#CC8899

Puce red
#722F37

Pullman Brown
(UPS Brown)
#644117

Pumpkin
#FF7518

Purple
#6A0DAD

Purple (HTML)
#800080

Purple (Munsell)
#9F00C5

Purple (X11)
#A020F0

Purple Heart
#69359C

Purple mountain majesty
#9678B6

Purple navy
#4E5180

Purple pizzazz

#FE4EDA

Purple Plum
#9C51B6

Purple taupe
#50404D

Purpureus
#9A4EAE

=== Q ===
Quartz
#51484F

Queen blue
#436B95

Queen pink
#E8CCD7

Quick silver
#A6A6A6

Quinacridone magenta
#8E3A59

Quincy
#6A5445

=== R ===
Rackley
#5D8AA8

Radical Red
#FF355E

Raisin black
#242124

Rajah
#FBAB60

Raspberry
#E30B5D

Raw Sienna
#D68A59

Raw umber
#826644

Razzmatazz
#E30B5C

Razzle Dazzle Rose
#FF33CC

Razzmic Berry
#8D4E85

Rebecca Purple
#663399

Red
#FF0000

Red (Crayola)
#EE204D

Red (Munsell)
#F2003C

Red (NCS)
#C40233

Red (Pantone)
#ED2939

Red (pigment)
#ED1C24

Red (RYB)
#FE2712

Red-brown
#A52A2A

Red cola
#DF0118

Red-orange (Crayola)
#FF681F

Red-orange (Color wheel)
#FF4500

Red rum
#973A4A

Red Salsa
#FD3A4A

Red strawberry
#EC0304

Red-violet
#C71585

Red-violet (Crayola)
#C0448F

Red-violet (Color wheel)
#922B3E

Redwood
#A45A52

Registration black
#000200

Resolution blue
#002387

Rhythm
#777696

Rich brilliant lavender
#F1A7FE

Rich carmine
#D70040

Rich electric blue
#0892D0

Rich lavender
#A76BCF

Rich lilac
#B666D2

Rich maroon
#B03060

Rifle green
#414833

Ripe mango
#FFC324

Roast coffee
#704241

Robin egg blue
#00CCCC

Rocket metallic
#8A7F80

Roman silver
#838996

Root beer
#290E05

Rose
#FF007F

Rose dust
#9E5E6F

Rose madder
#E32636

Royal azure
#0038A8

Royal blue
#002366

Royal blue
#4169E1

Royal brown
#523B35

Royal fuchsia
#CA2C92

Royal green
#136207

Royal orange
#F99245

Royal pink
#E73895

Royal red
#9B1C31

Royal red
#D00060

Royal purple
#7851A9

Royal yellow
#FADA5E

Ruby
#E0115F

Rufous
#A81C07

Rum
#9A4E40

Russet
#80461B

Russian green
#679267

Russian violet
#32174D

Rust
#B7410E

Rusty red
#DA2C43

=== S ===
Sacramento State green
#043927

Saddle Brown
#8B4513

Safety orange
#FF7800

Safety orange
(blaze orange)
#FF6700

Safety yellow
#EED202

Saffron
#F4C430

Sage
#BCB88A

St. Patrick's blue
#23297A

Salem
#177B4D

Salmon
#FA8072

Salmon Rose
#E7968B

Salmon pink
#FF91A4

Samsung blue
#12279E

Sand
#C2B280

Sand dune
#967117

Sandy brown
#F4A460

Sandy taupe
#967117

Sap green
#507D2A

Sapphire
#0F52BA

Sapphire blue
#0067A5

Satin sheen gold
#CBA135

Savoy blue
#4B61D1

Scarlet
#FF2400

Scarlet (Crayola)
#FD0E35

Schauss pink
#FF91AF

School bus yellow
#FFD800

Screamin' green
#66FF66

Sea blue
#006994

Sea foam green
#2E8B57

Sea green
#2E8B57

Sea green (Crayola)
#00FFCD

Seal brown
#59260B

Seashell
#FFF5EE

Selective yellow
#FFBA00

Sepia
#704214

SGBUS green
#55DD33

Shadow
#8A795D

Shadow blue
#778BA5

Shampoo
#FFCFF1

Shamrock green
#009E60

Shandy
#FFE670

Sheen green
#8FD400

Shimmering Blush
#D98695

Shiny shamrock
#5FA778

Shocking pink
#FC0FC0

Shocking pink (Crayola)
#FF6FFF

Sienna
#882D17

Silver
#C0C0C0

Silver (Crayola)
#C9C0BB

Silver (Metallic)
#AAA9AD

Silver chalice
#ACACAC

Silver foil
#AFB1AE

Silver Lake blue
#5D89BA

Silver pink
#C4AEAD

Silver sand
#BFC1C2

Sinopia
#CB410B

Sizzling Red
#FF3855

Sizzling Sunrise
#FFDB00

Skobeloff
#007474

Sky blue
#87CEEB

Sky blue (Crayola)
#76D7EA

Sky magenta
#CF71AF

Slate blue
#6A5ACD

Slate gray
#708090

Slimy green
#299617

Smalt (Dark powder blue)
#003399

Smoke
#738276

Smokey Topaz
#832A0D

Smoky black
#100C08

Soap
#CEC8EF

Solid pink
#893843

Sonic silver
#757575

Spartan Crimson
#9E1316

Space cadet
#1D2951

Spanish bister
(Spanish bistre)
#807532

Spanish blue
#0070B8

Spanish carmine
#D10047

Spanish crimson
#E51A4C

Spanish gray
#989898

Spanish green
#009150

Spanish orange
#E86100

Spanish pink
#F7BFBE

Spanish purple
#66033C

Spanish red
#E60026

Spanish sky blue
#00FFFF

Spanish violet
#4C2882

Spanish viridian
#007F5C

Spanish yellow
#F6B511

Spicy mix
#8B5f4D

Spring bud
#A7FC00

Spring Frost
#87FF2A

Spring green
#00FF7F

Spring green (Crayola)
#ECEBBD

Star command blue
#007BB8

Steel blue
#4682B4

Steel pink
#CC33CC

Steel teal
#5F8A8F

Stil de grain yellow
#FADA5E

Stop red
#CF142B

Straw
#E4D96F

Strawberry
#FC5A8D

Strawberry iced tea
#FC5A8D

Strawberry red
#C83F49

Sugar plum
#914E75

Sunglow
#FFCC33

Sunray
#E3AB57

Sunset
#FAD6A5

Sunset orange
#FD5E53

Super pink
#CF6BA9

Sweet Brown
#A83731

=== T ===
Tan
#D2B48C

Tan (Crayola)
#D99A6C

Tangelo
#F94D00

Tangerine
#F28500

Tangerine yellow
#FFCC00

Tango pink
#E4717A

Tart Orange
#FB4D46

Taupe
#483C32

Taupe gray
#8B8589

Tea green
#D0F0C0

Tea rose
#F88379

Tea rose
#F4C2C2

Teal
#008080

Teal blue
#367588

Teal deer
#99E6B3

Teal green
#00827F

Technobotanica
#00FFBF

Telemagenta
#CF3476

Temptress
#3C2126

Tenné (tawny)
#CD5700

Terra cotta
#E2725B

Thistle
#D8BFD8

Thistle (Crayola)
#EBB0D7

Thulian pink
#DE6FA1

Tickle Me Pink
#FC89AC

Tiffany Blue
#81D8D0

Tiger's eye
#E08D3C

Timberwolf
#DBD7D2

Titanium
#878681

Titanium yellow
#EEE600

Toad
#8B7D6B

Tomato
#FF6347

Tomato sauce
#B21807

Tooth
#FFFAFA

Topaz
#FFC87C

Tractor red
#FD0E35

Traffic Black
#2A2D2F

Traffic Blue
#0E518D

Traffic Gray A
#8F9695

Traffic Gray B
#4E5451

Traffic Green
#008754

Traffic Orange
#E15501

Traffic Purple
#992572

Traffic Red
#C1121C

Traffic White
#F7FBF5

Traffic Yellow
#F7B500

Trolley gray
#808080

Tropical rain forest
#00755E

Tropical violet
#CDA4DE

True blue
#0073CF

True purple
#BF00FF

Tufts blue
#417DC1

Tulip
#FF878D

Tumbleweed
#DEAA88

Turkish rose
#B57281

Turquoise
#40E0D0

Turquoise blue
#00FFEF

Turquoise green
#A0D6B4

Tuscan brown
#6F4E37

Tuscan red
#7C4848

Tuscan tan
#A67B5B

Tuscany
#C09999

Twitter blue
#26A7DE

Twilight lavender
#8A496B

Tyrian purple
#66023C

=== U ===
Ultramarine
#3F00FF

Ultramarine blue
#4166F5

Ultramarine blue
(Caran d'Ache)
#2111EF

Ultra pink
#FF6FFF

Ultra red
#FC6C85

Umber
#635147

Unbleached silk
#FFDDCA

United Nations blue
#5B92E5

Unmellow yellow
#FFFF66

UP maroon
#7B1113

Upsdell red
#AE2029

Urobilin
#E1AD21

=== V ===
Vampire Black
#080808

Van Dyke brown
#664228

Vanilla
#F3E5AB

Vanilla ice (#2)
#F38FA9

Vanilla ice (#3)
#F3D9DF

Vantablack
#000100

Vantg blue
#5271FF

Vegas gold
#C5B358

Venetian red
#C80815

Verdigris
#43B3AE

Vermilion
#E34234

Vermilion (Medium)
#D9381E

Veronica
#A020F0

Very light azure
#74BBFB

Very light blue
#6666FF

Very light malachite green
#64E986

Very light tangelo
#FFB077

Very pale orange
#FFDFBF

Very pale yellow
#FFFFBF

Vibrant Purple
#AA00FF

Vine Green
#38A32A

Violet
#8F00FF

Violet (Caran d'Ache)
#6E00C0

Violet (color wheel)
#8000FF

Violet (crayola)
#963D7F

Violet (RYB)
#8601AF

Violet (web)
#EE82EE

Violet-blue
#324AB2

Violet-blue (Crayola)

#766EC8

Violin Brown
#674403

Viridian
#40826D

Viridian green
#009698

Vista blue
#7C9ED9

Vivid amber
#cc9900

Vivid auburn
#922724

Vivid burgundy
#9F1D35

Vivid cerise
#DA1D81

Vivid cerulean
#00AAEE

Vivid crimson
#CC0033

Vivid gamboge
#FF9900

Vivid lime green
#A6D608

Vivid malachite
#00CC33

Vivid mulberry
#B80CE3

Vivid orange
#FF5F00

Vivid orange peel
#FFA000

Vivid orchid
#CC00FF

Vivid raspberry
#FF006C

Vivid red
#F70D1A

Vivid sky blue
#00CCFF

Vivid red-tangelo
#DF6124

Vivid tangelo
#F07427

Vivid tangerine
#FFA089

Vivid vermilion
#e56024

Vivid violet
#9F00FF

Vivid yellow
#FFE302

Volt
#CEFF00

=== W ===
Water
#D4F1F9

Watermelon
#F05C85

Watermelon red
#BF4147

Watermelon Yellow
#EEFF1B

Waterspout
#A4F4F9

Websafe Indigo
#330099

Websafe Scarlet
#FF3300

Wenge
#645452

Wheat
#F5DEB3

White
#FFFFFF

White chocolate
#EDE6D6

White coffee
#E6E0D4

White smoke
#F5F5F5

Wild blue yonder
#A2ADD0

Wild orchid
#D470A2

Wild Strawberry
#FF43A4

Wild watermelon
#FC6C85

Willpower orange
#FD5800

Windsor tan
#A75502

Wine
#722F37

Wine red
#B11226

Winter Sky
#FF007C

Wintergreen dream
#56887D

Wisteria
#C9A0DC

Wood brown
#C19A6B

=== X ===
Xanadu
#738678

Xander
#44500C

Xanthic
#EEED09

Xanthous
#F1B42F

Xbox Green
#0E7A0D

Xiaomi Orange
#FD4900

Xumo
#413639

=== Y ===
Yale blue
#0F4D92

Yale blue (#2)
#00356B

Yellow
#FFFF00

Yellow (Crayola)
#FCE883

Yellow (Munsell)
#EFCC00

Yellow (NCS)
#FFD300

Yellow (Pantone)
#FEDF00

Yellow (process)
#FFEF00

Yellow (RYB)
#FEFE33

Yellow-green
#9ACD32

Yellow-green (Crayola)
#C5E384

Yellow Orange
#FFAE42

Yellow rose
#FFF000

Yellow Sunshine
#FFF700

YInMn Blue
#2E5090

=== Z ===
Zaffer (Zaffre)
#0014A8

Zarqa
#FF4500

Zeal
#91E0B7

Zebra White
#F5F5F5

Zinc Gray
#655B55

Zinc White
#FDF8FF

Zinc Yellow
#FACA30

Zinfandel Red
#5A3844

Zinnwaldite brown
#2C1608

Zinzolin
#6C0277

Zircon Blue
#00849D

Zircon Gray
#807473

Zomp
#39A78E

Zydeco
#20483F

== See also ==
- List of colors by shade
