= Spring bud =

Color

Spring Bud

Color coordinates
- Hex triplet: #A7FC00
- sRGB^{B} (r, g, b): (167, 252, 0)
- HSV (h, s, v): (80°, 100%, 99%)
- CIELCh_{uv} (L, C, h): (91, 114, 112°)
- Source: Maerz and Paul
- ISCC–NBS descriptor: Vivid yellow green
- B: Normalized to [0–255] (byte)

Spring bud is the color that used to be called spring green before the X11 web color spring green was formulated in 1987 when the X11 colors were first promulgated. This color is now called spring bud to avoid confusion with the web color.

The color is also called soft spring green, spring green (traditional), or spring green (M&P).

The first recorded use of spring green as a color name in English (meaning the color that is now called spring bud) was in 1766.

== Variations of spring bud ==
=== Pale spring bud ===
Spring Green (Crayola)

Color coordinates
- Hex triplet: #ECEBBD
- sRGB^{B} (r, g, b): (236, 235, 189)
- HSV (h, s, v): (59°, 20%, 93%)
- CIELCh_{uv} (L, C, h): (92, 34, 85°)
- Source: Crayola
- ISCC–NBS descriptor: Light yellow green
- B: Normalized to [0–255] (byte)

This pale tone of spring bud is the color called spring green in Crayola crayons. (See spring green on the List of Crayola crayon colors).

=== Medium spring bud ===
Spring Bud (ISCC-NBS)

Color coordinates
- Hex triplet: #C9DC87
- sRGB^{B} (r, g, b): (201, 220, 135)
- HSV (h, s, v): (73°, 39%, 86%)
- CIELCh_{uv} (L, C, h): (85, 57, 98°)
- Source: ISCC-NBS
- ISCC–NBS descriptor: Brilliant yellow green
- B: Normalized to [0–255] (byte)

At right is displayed the medium tone of spring bud that is called "spring bud" on the ISCC-NBS color list.

The source of this color is the following website, the ISCC-NBS Dictionary of Color Names (1955) (a site for stamp collectors to identify the colors of their stamps)--Color Sample of Spring Bud (color sample #119):

=== June bud ===
June Bud

Color coordinates
- Hex triplet: #BDDA57
- sRGB^{B} (r, g, b): (189, 218, 87)
- HSV (h, s, v): (73°, 60%, 85%)
- CIELCh_{uv} (L, C, h): (83, 78, 99°)
- Source: ISCC-NBS
- ISCC–NBS descriptor: Brilliant yellow green
- B: Normalized to [0–255] (byte)

At right is the less saturated color june bud.

=== Bud green ===
Bud Green

Color coordinates
- Hex triplet: #7BB661
- sRGB^{B} (r, g, b): (123, 182, 97)
- HSV (h, s, v): (102°, 47%, 71%)
- CIELCh_{uv} (L, C, h): (68, 61, 119°)
- Source: Pantone TPX
- ISCC–NBS descriptor: Strong yellowish green
- B: Normalized to [0–255] (byte)

The color bud green is displayed at right.

The source of this color is the "Pantone Textile Paper eXtended (TPX)" color list, color #15-6442 TPX—Bud Green.

=== May green ===
May Green

Color coordinates
- Hex triplet: #4C9141
- sRGB^{B} (r, g, b): (76, 145, 65)
- HSV (h, s, v): (112°, 55%, 57%)
- CIELCh_{uv} (L, C, h): (54, 58, 125°)
- Source: RAL
- ISCC–NBS descriptor: Strong yellowish green
- B: Normalized to [0–255] (byte)

Displayed at right is the color may green.

This is one of the colors in the RAL color matching system, a color system widely used in Europe. The RAL color list originated in 1927, and it reached its present form in 1961.

== See also ==
- List of colors
