= Champagne (color) =

Color

Color coordinates
- Hex triplet: #F7E7CE
- sRGB^{B} (r, g, b): (247, 231, 206)
- HSV (h, s, v): (37°, 17%, 97%)
- CIELCh_{uv} (L, C, h): (92, 23, 62°)
- Source: Maerz and Paul
- ISCC–NBS descriptor: Pale yellow
- B: Normalized to [0–255] (byte)

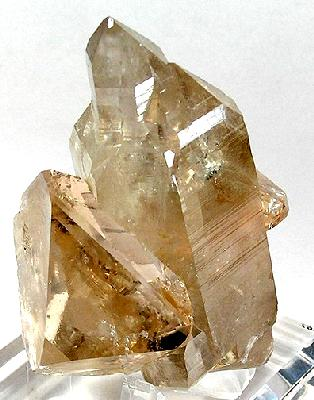
Champagne-colored topaz crystals on quartz

The color champagne is a name given for various very pale tints of yellowish-orange that are close to beige. The color's name is derived from the typical color of the beverage Champagne.

== Champagne ==
Champagne

Color coordinates
- Hex triplet: #F7E7CE
- sRGB^{B} (r, g, b): (247, 231, 206)
- HSV (h, s, v): (37°, 17%, 97%)
- CIELCh_{uv} (L, C, h): (92, 23, 62°)
- Source: 99colors.net/Maerz and Paul
- ISCC–NBS descriptor: Pale yellowish-orange
- B: Normalized to [0–255] (byte)

The color champagne is displayed adjacent.

The first recorded use of champagne as a color name in English was in 1915.

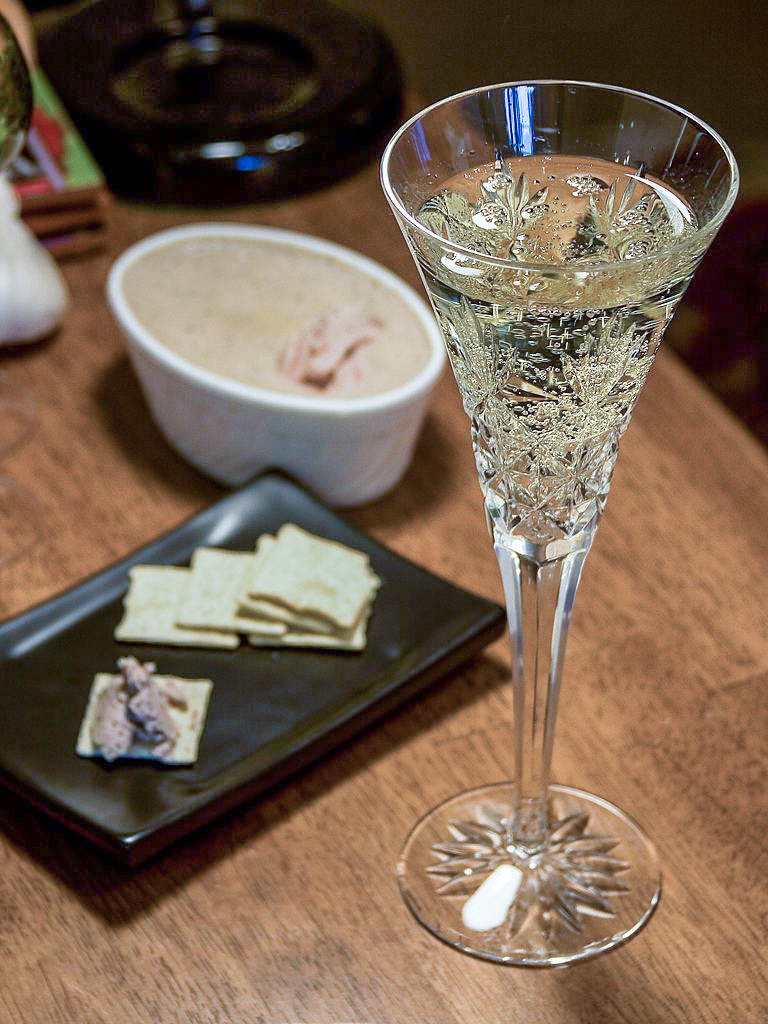
A glass of Champagne

== Variations of champagne ==
=== Medium champagne ===
Medium champagne

Color coordinates
- Hex triplet: #F3E5AB
- sRGB^{B} (r, g, b): (243, 229, 171)
- HSV (h, s, v): (48°, 30%, 95%)
- CIELCh_{uv} (L, C, h): (91, 44, 75°)
- Source: ISCC-NBS
- ISCC–NBS descriptor: Pale greenish yellow
- B: Normalized to [0–255] (byte)

Adjacent is displayed the color medium champagne.

The medium tone of "champagne" displayed at right is the color called champagne in the Dictionary of Color Names (1955) in color sample #89.

=== Deep champagne ===
Deep champagne

Color coordinates
- Hex triplet: #FAD6A5
- sRGB^{B} (r, g, b): (250, 214, 165)
- HSV (h, s, v): (35°, 34%, 98%)
- CIELCh_{uv} (L, C, h): (88, 47, 56°)
- Source: ISCC-NBS
- ISCC–NBS descriptor: Light yellow
- B: Normalized to [0–255] (byte)

The deep tone of "champagne" displayed adjacent is the color called champagne in the Dictionary of Color Names (1955) in color sample #73.

=== Dark champagne ===
Dark champagne

Color coordinates
- Hex triplet: #C2B280
- sRGB^{B} (r, g, b): (194, 178, 128)
- HSV (h, s, v): (45°, 34%, 76%)
- CIELCh_{uv} (L, C, h): (73, 39, 71°)
- Source: ISCC-NBS
- ISCC–NBS descriptor: Grayish yellow
- B: Normalized to [0–255] (byte)

Adjacent is displayed the color dark champagne.

The dark tone of "champagne" displayed adjacent is the color called champagne in the ISCC-NBS Dictionary of Color Names (1955) in color sample #90.

== Champagne in human culture ==
Animal husbandry

- Champagne is a horse color used to describe some horses (see champagne gene).

Astronomy

- SN 2003fg was an aberrant type Ia supernova discovered in 2003 and described in the journal Nature on September 21, 2006. It was nicknamed the Champagne Supernova after the 1996 song "Champagne Supernova" by the English rock band Oasis.

Merchandise

- Champagne is most often used to describe gemstones or paint finishes (such as for an automobile) in order to imply that one is purchasing a luxury product.

== See also ==
- List of colors
