= Puce =

Color

Color coordinates
- Hex triplet: #CC8899
- sRGB^{B} (r, g, b): (204, 136, 153)
- HSV (h, s, v): (345°, 33%, 80%)
- CIELCh_{uv} (L, C, h): (64, 43, 356°)
- Source: 99colors.net
- ISCC–NBS descriptor: Dark pink
- B: Normalized to [0–255] (byte)

Puce is a brownish purple color. The term comes from the French couleur puce, literally meaning "flea color".

Puce became popular in the late 18th century in France. It appeared in clothing at the court of Louis XVI. The color was said to be a favourite color of Marie Antoinette; however, there are no portraits of her wearing it.

Puce was also a popular fashion color in 19th-century Paris. In his novel Nana, Émile Zola describes a woman "dressed in a dark gown of an equivocal color, somewhere between puce and goose shit." In Victor Hugo's Les Misérables, Mademoiselle Baptistine wears "a gown of puce-colored silk, of the fashion of 1806, which she had purchased at that date in Paris, and which had lasted ever since."

In traditional Japanese iron work, bronze and copper are given a puce hue when coated in a solution of antimony trichloride dissolved in hydrochloric acid.

== Variations of puce ==
=== Puce (ISCC-NBS) ===
Puce (ISCC-NBS)

Color coordinates
- Hex triplet: #722F37
- sRGB^{B} (r, g, b): (114, 47, 55)
- HSV (h, s, v): (353°, 59%, 45%)
- CIELCh_{uv} (L, C, h): (29, 45, 7°)
- Source: ISCC-NBS
- ISCC–NBS descriptor: Dark red
- B: Normalized to [0–255] (byte)

The color to the right is the color called puce in the ISCC-NBS Dictionary of Color Names (1955). Since this color has a hue code of 353, it is a slightly purplish red.

=== Puce (Maerz and Paul) ===
Puce (M&P)

Color coordinates
- Hex triplet: #A95C68
- sRGB^{B} (r, g, b): (169, 92, 104)
- HSV (h, s, v): (351°, 46%, 66%)
- CIELCh_{uv} (L, C, h): (48, 51, 4°)
- Source: Maerz and Paul
- ISCC–NBS descriptor: Moderate red
- B: Normalized to [0–255] (byte)

The color box to the right shows the color called puce in the 1930 book by Maerz and Paul, A Dictionary of Color; the color puce is displayed on page 37, Plate 7, Color Sample H4.

=== Puce (Pourpre color list) ===
Puce (Pourpre color list)

Color coordinates
- Hex triplet: #4E1609
- sRGB^{B} (r, g, b): (78, 22, 9)
- HSV (h, s, v): (11°, 88%, 31%)
- CIELCh_{uv} (L, C, h): (17, 38, 18°)
- Source: Pourpre.com
- ISCC–NBS descriptor: Deep brown
- B: Normalized to [0–255] (byte)

At right is the color called puce in the Pourpre.com color list, a color list widely popular in France. This is the original puce, from which all other tones of puce ultimately derive.

=== Puce (Pantone) ===
Puce (Pantone)

Color coordinates
- Hex triplet: #4F3A3C
- sRGB^{B} (r, g, b): (79, 58, 60)
- HSV (h, s, v): (354°, 27%, 31%)
- CIELCh_{uv} (L, C, h): (27, 12, 6°)
- Source: Pantone TPX
- ISCC–NBS descriptor: Dark grayish reddish brown
- B: Normalized to [0–255] (byte)

The color at right is called puce in the Pantone color list.

The source of this color is the "Pantone Textile Paper eXtended (TPX)" color list, color #19-1518 TPX—Puce.

== See also ==
- List of colors
