= Wild blue yonder =

Wild blue yonder may refer to:

- "The U.S. Air Force" (song), the official song of the United States Air Force, often referred to as "Wild Blue Yonder"
- The Wild Blue Yonder (1951 film), an American war film by Allan Dwan
- The Wild Blue Yonder (2005 film), a science-fiction film by Werner Herzog
- Wild blue yonder, a Crayola crayon color
- "Wild Blue Yonder", a 1984 single by Screaming Blue Messiahs, from their Gun Shy LP
- Wild Blue Yonder, a 1998 album by Flat Duo Jets
- "Wild Blue Yonder", a 2006 single by Paul Weller
- "Wild Blue Yonder" (Doctor Who), an episode of the 2023 specials of Doctor Who

== See also ==
- BlueYonder, formerly JDA Software
