= Marigold (color) =

Yellow-orange color

Color coordinates
- Hex triplet: #FF9F00
- sRGB^{B} (r, g, b): (255, 159, 0)
- HSV (h, s, v): (37°, 100%, 100%)
- CIELCh_{uv} (L, C, h): (74, 107, 42°)
- Source: ISCC-NBS
- ISCC–NBS descriptor: Strong orange yellow
- B: Normalized to [0–255] (byte)

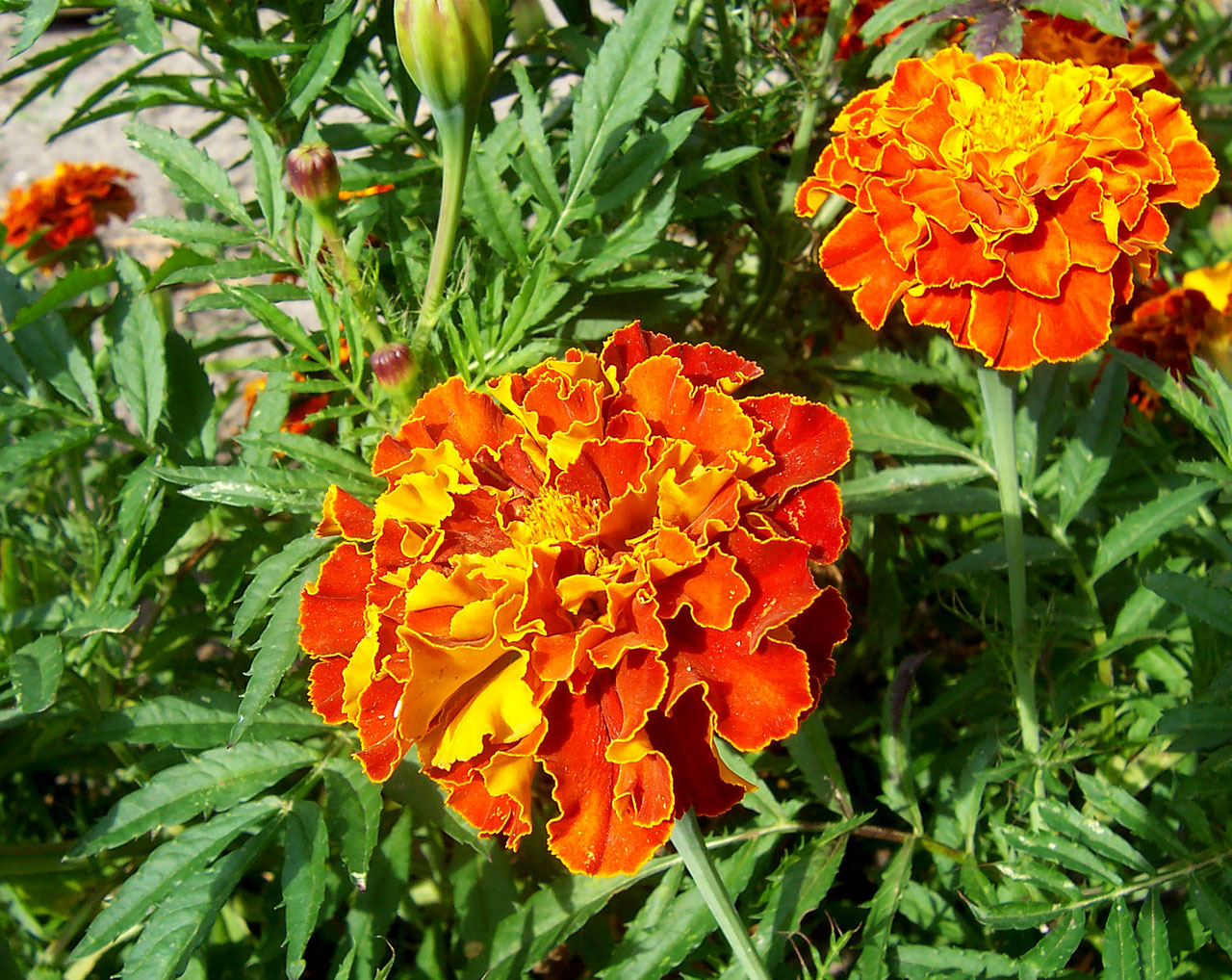
French marigolds

Marigold is a yellow-orange color. It is named after the flower of the same name.

New Zealand author Katherine Mansfield used "marigold" to describe a hair colour in her short story Something Childish But Very Natural in 1914.

== Variations of marigold ==
=== Gold ===
Gold (golden)

Color coordinates
- Hex triplet: #FFD700
- sRGB^{B} (r, g, b): (255, 215, 0)
- HSV (h, s, v): (51°, 100%, 100%)
- CIELCh_{uv} (L, C, h): (87, 99, 69°)
- Source: X11
- ISCC–NBS descriptor: Vivid yellow
- B: Normalized to [0–255] (byte)

Gold, also called golden, is one of a variety of yellow-orange color blends used to give the impression of the color of the element gold.

The web color gold is sometimes referred to as golden to distinguish it from the color metallic gold. The use of gold as a color term in traditional usage is more often applied to the color "metallic gold".

=== Yellow-orange ===
Yellow Orange

Color coordinates
- Hex triplet: #FFAE42
- sRGB^{B} (r, g, b): (255, 174, 66)
- HSV (h, s, v): (34°, 74%, 100%)
- CIELCh_{uv} (L, C, h): (77, 94, 46°)
- Source: Crayola
- ISCC–NBS descriptor: Strong orange yellow
- B: Normalized to [0–255] (byte)

Yellow-orange has been a Crayola crayon color since 1930.

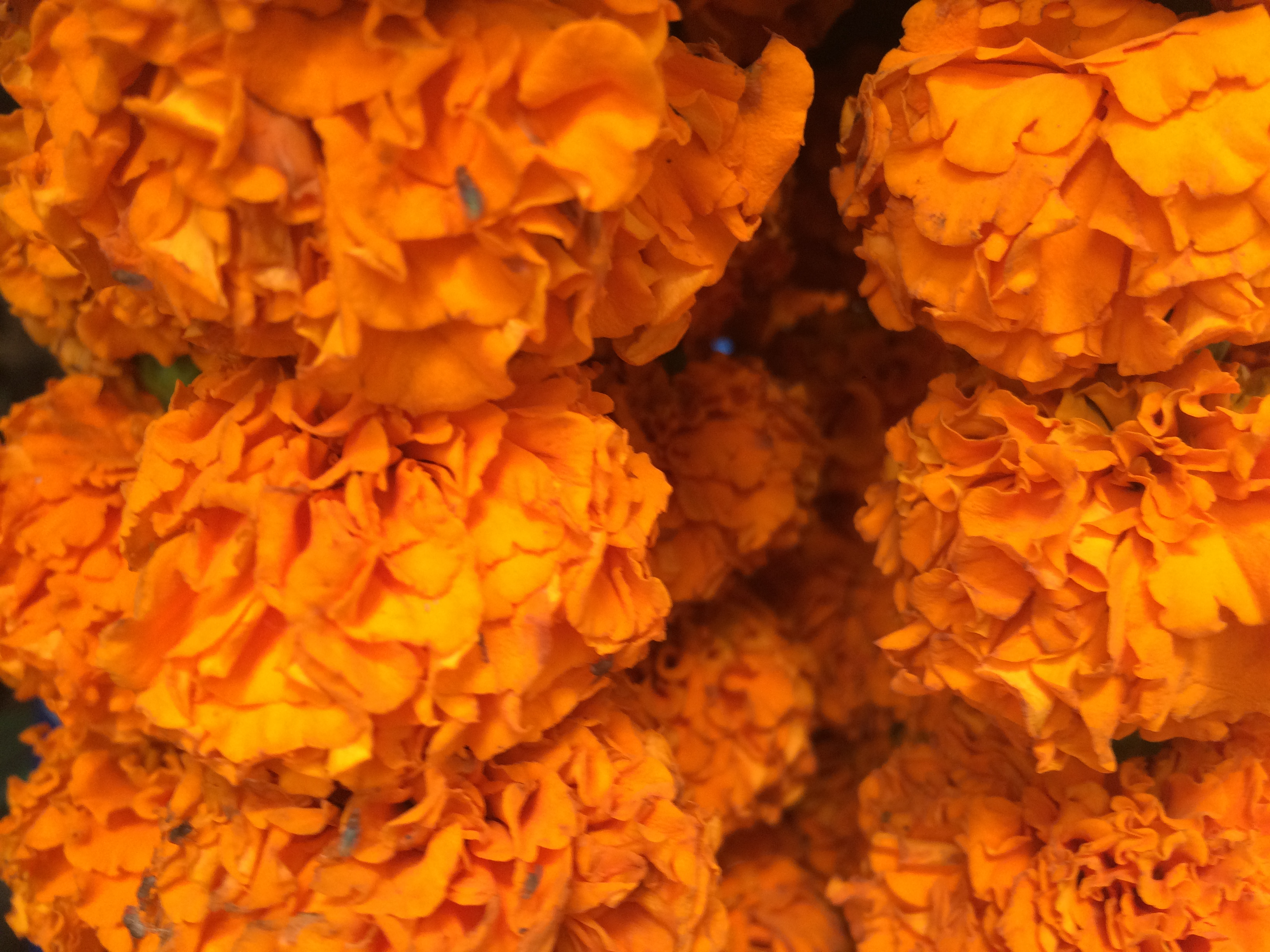
Marigold Flowers as garland in India

=== Orange-yellow ===
Orange Yellow

Color coordinates
- Hex triplet: #F8D568
- sRGB^{B} (r, g, b): (248, 213, 104)
- HSV (h, s, v): (45°, 58%, 97%)
- CIELCh_{uv} (L, C, h): (86, 76, 67°)
- Source: Crayola
- ISCC–NBS descriptor: Brilliant yellow
- B: Normalized to [0–255] (byte)

Orange-yellow was a Crayola crayon color from 1958 to 1990.

=== Goldenrod ===
Goldenrod

Color coordinates
- Hex triplet: #DAA520
- sRGB^{B} (r, g, b): (218, 165, 32)
- HSV (h, s, v): (43°, 85%, 85%)
- CIELCh_{uv} (L, C, h): (71, 83, 58°)
- Source: X11
- ISCC–NBS descriptor: Strong yellow
- B: Normalized to [0–255] (byte)

Displayed at right is the web color goldenrod.

The color goldenrod is a representation of the color of some of the deeper gold colored goldenrod flowers.

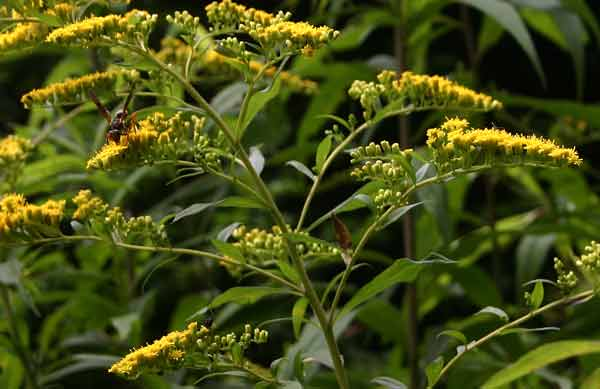
Solidago (goldenrod)

The first recorded use of goldenrod as a color name in English was in 1915.

== See also ==
- Gold (color)
- List of colors
