= Brilliant Green =

Brilliant Green may refer to:

- The Brilliant Green, Japanese rock band
  - The Brilliant Green (album), the band's eponymous debut album
- Brilliant green (dye), a dye and antiseptic
- The book Brilliant Green: The Surprising History and Science of Plant Intelligence by Stefano Mancuso and Alessandra Viola (translated from the Italian by Joan Benham, with a foreword by Michael Pollan, published by Island Press in 2015)

== See also ==
- Emerald (color)
