= Vanilla (color) =

Color coordinates
- Hex triplet: #F3E5AB
- sRGB^{B} (r, g, b): (243, 229, 171)
- HSV (h, s, v): (48°, 30%, 95%)
- CIELCh_{uv} (L, C, h): (91, 44, 75°)
- Source: ISCC-NBS
- ISCC–NBS descriptor: Pale greenish yellow
- B: Normalized to [0–255] (byte)

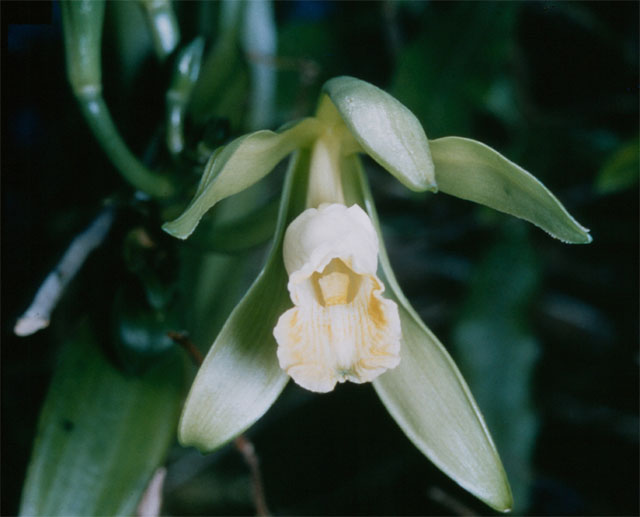
Vanilla orchid

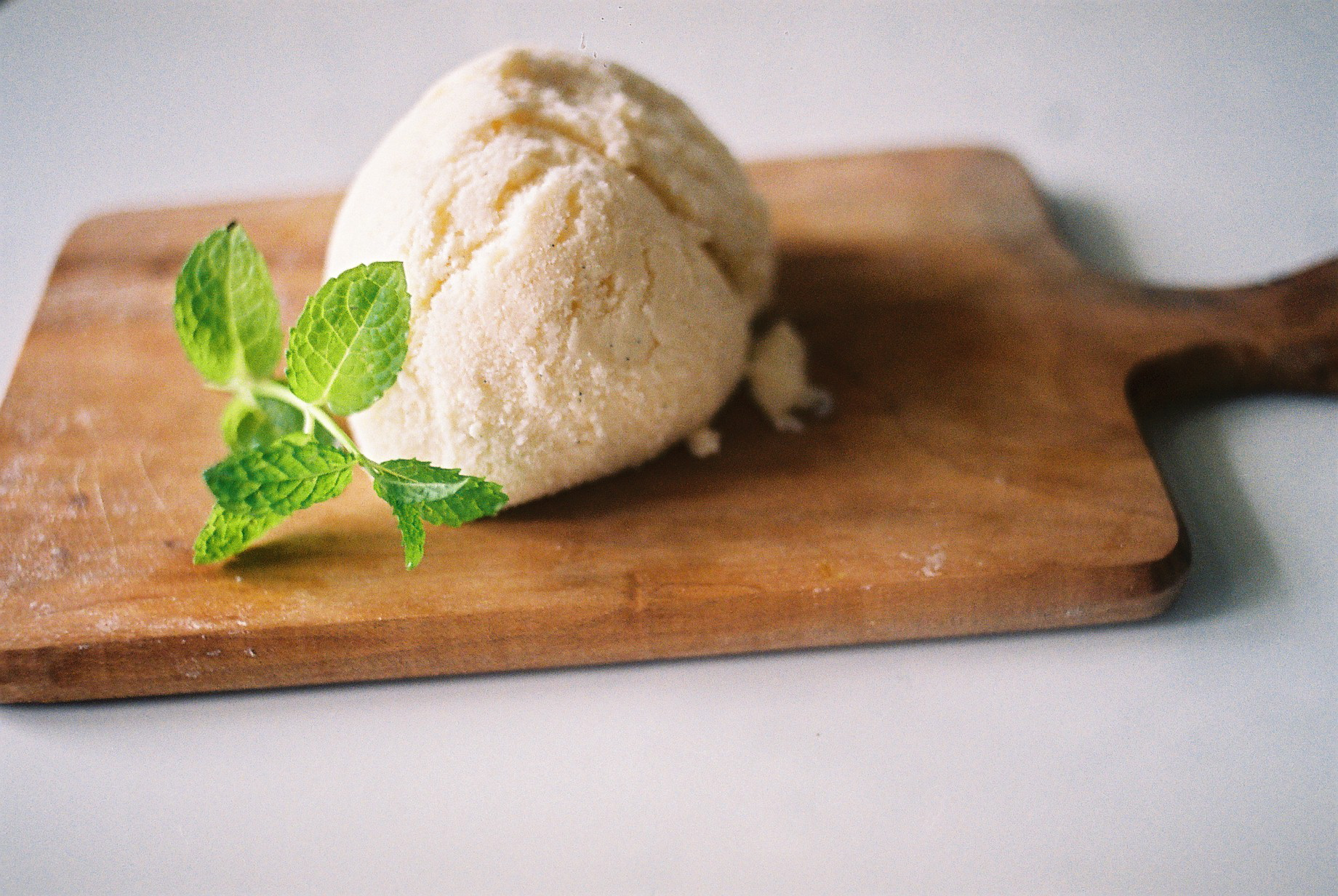
Vanilla ice cream with mint

The color vanilla is a rich tint of off-white as well as a medium pale tint of yellow.

The first recorded use of vanilla as a color name in English was in 1925.

== Variations of vanilla ==
=== Vanilla ice ===
Vanilla Ice

Color coordinates
- Hex triplet: #F3D9DF
- sRGB^{B} (r, g, b): (243, 217, 223)
- HSV (h, s, v): (346°, 11%, 95%)
- CIELCh_{uv} (L, C, h): (89, 15, 355°)
- Source: Resene Color List
- ISCC–NBS descriptor: Pale yellowish pink
- B: Normalized to [0–255] (byte)

At right is displayed the color vanilla ice.

The color name vanilla ice for this pinkish tone of vanilla has been in use at least since 2001, when it was one of the colors on the Resene color list.

=== Dark vanilla ===
Vanilla (Xona.com)

Color coordinates
- Hex triplet: #D1BEA8
- sRGB^{B} (r, g, b): (209, 190, 168)
- HSV (h, s, v): (32°, 20%, 82%)
- CIELCh_{uv} (L, C, h): (78, 23, 56°)
- Source: Xona.com Color List
- ISCC–NBS descriptor: Grayish yellow
- B: Normalized to [0–255] (byte)

At right is displayed the color dark vanilla.

This is the color called vanilla on the Xona.com Color List.

== Vanilla in culture ==
Film

- Vanilla Sky is a 2001 American psychological thriller film directed by Cameron Crowe.

Music

- Vanilla Ice is an American rapper whose single "Ice Ice Baby" was the first hip hop single to top the Billboard charts--this occurred in 1990.

== See also ==
- Chocolate (color)
- List of colors
