= Candy apple red =

Shade of red

Color coordinates
- Hex triplet: #FF0800
- sRGB^{B} (r, g, b): (255, 8, 0)
- HSV (h, s, v): (2°, 100%, 100%)
- CIELCh_{uv} (L, C, h): (53, 178, 12°)
- Source: ColorHexa
- ISCC–NBS descriptor: Vivid reddish orange
- B: Normalized to [0–255] (byte)

Candy apple red (occasionally known as apple-candy red) is the name code used by manufacturing companies to define a shade of red similar to the red sugar coating on candied apples. The typical method for producing a candy apple finish is to apply a metallic base-coat, followed by a translucent color coat. A final clear coat adds additional gloss.

== Variations ==
=== Candy pink ===
Candy Pink

Color coordinates
- Hex triplet: #E4717A
- sRGB^{B} (r, g, b): (228, 113, 122)
- HSV (h, s, v): (355°, 50%, 89%)
- CIELCh_{uv} (L, C, h): (61, 82, 9°)
- Source: ISCC-NBS
- ISCC–NBS descriptor: Deep pink
- B: Normalized to [0–255] (byte)

Displayed at right is the color candy pink.

The color candy apple red is not mentioned in the 1930 book A Dictionary of Color by Maerz and Paul. However, a color called candy pink is mentioned, the first recorded use of which as a color name is recorded as being in 1926.

== In culture ==
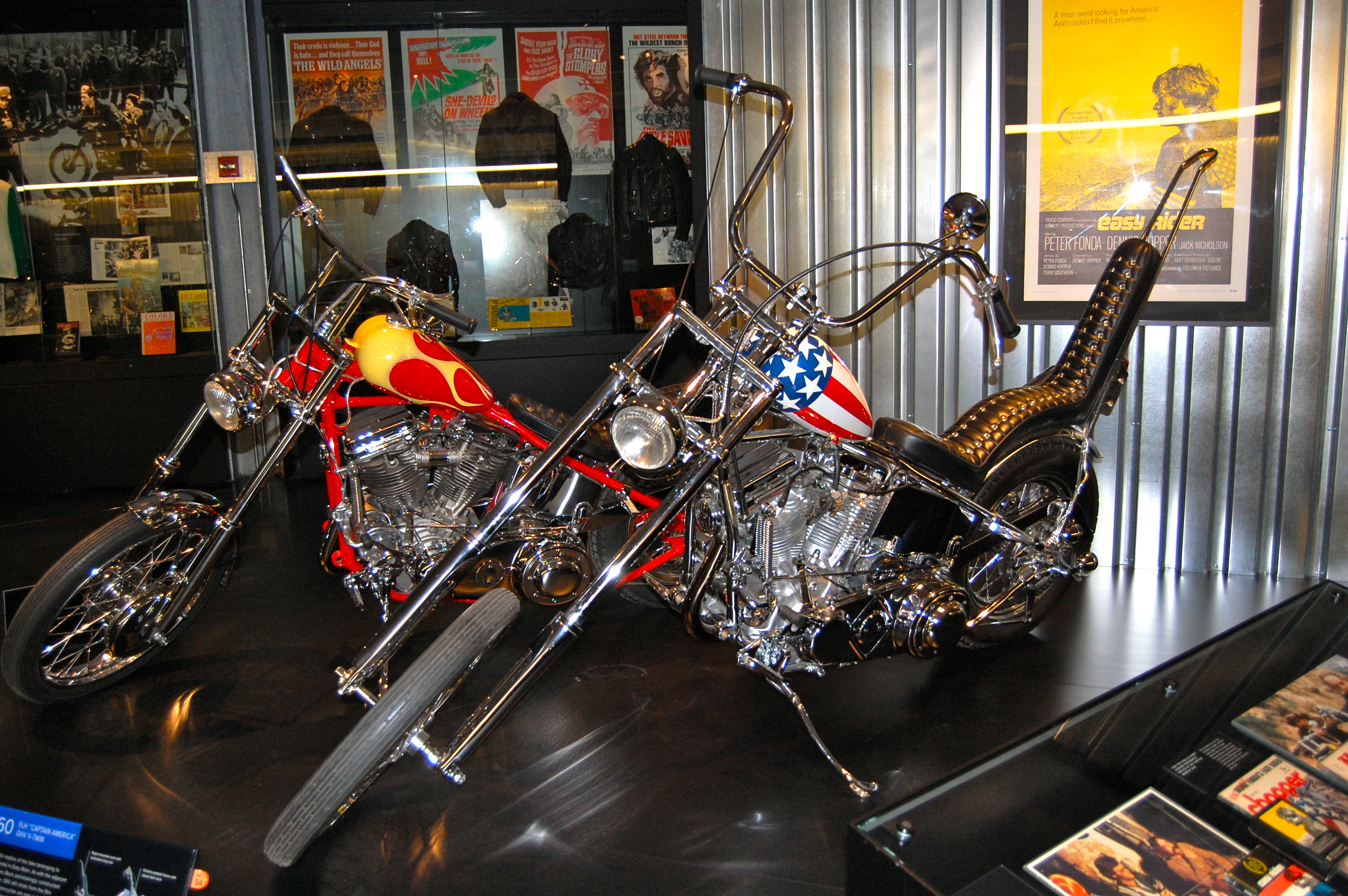
The Billy Bike Harley Chopper in Easy Rider was painted in candy apple red with a flame design on the tear drop gas tank

=== Automobiles ===
A color named Candy Apple Red was first officially used on a production car by Ford in 1966, but it was a bright, non-metallic red. It was not until 1996 that Chrysler, and GM in 2001, had a similarly named production paint. An automotive paint search of "apple" shows that historically the name was associated with a green color going back to the early 1930s.

Candy apple red is a popular color for car companies to manufacture automobiles in because "candy apple red" colored automobiles sell quickly.

The "candy apple red" is not just the name of a color, it is also implies a specific paint process for cars and other objects: The phrase candy apple red, describes a very specific paint process first used on custom cars and hot rods sometime in the early 1950s (date not specified, per audio interview with Joe Bailon, candy apple red inventor). In the candy apple red paint process, the body of the car or other object to be painted must be finished as perfectly as possible to avoid easily visible problems in the finished paint. After the body is properly prepared, primer is applied as usual. Then a highly reflective metallic paint is applied first. This is usually highly reflective silver paint, but the color effect can be modified by using metallic gold or other tinted metallic paint. The key with this first metallic color layer is to reflect as much light as possible. The candy apple red paint is applied on top of the reflective metallic paint. This candy apple red paint is transparent. Many coats are required to achieve the proper appearance-of-depth and richness-of-color. Once the candy apple red color reaches the proper appearance of depth and color intensity, multiple coats of clear paint are applied to protect the paint job and add to the feeling of depth of the paint. Candy Apple Red appears so intense, because light passes through the paint, reflects off of the metallic base color, and passes through the paint a second time before we see the color. This causes real candy apple red paint to look far more intense and attractive than conventional paints that happen to use the name "candy apple red" without actually being real candy apple red paint. Candy apple red" paint has been used on many objects other than cars or trucks. Electric guitars, home décor items, loudspeakers, and a variety of other items have been available (or their owner's had custom paint applied) with candy apple red finish. An early use of candy apple red by an automobile manufacturer was Ford's 1963 Thunderbird Italian concept car that appeared in North American auto shows (including Autorama shows) in 1963 and in the New York Worlds Fair in 1964 in Ford's pavilion. But because of the complexity and time (and cost) required to apply real candy apple red paint to a car, until the introduction of the Soul Red option by Mazda in 2013 along with its proprietary robotic painting process that mimics the laborious hand-painting process required by true candy apple red, no production cars have been factory-painted with true candy apple red paint other than cars (or trucks) from smaller specialty manufacturers willing to provide custom finishes per customer's request/sample.

Candy apple red paint with silver metallic reflective undercoat looks quite different from candy apple red with gold metallic reflective undercoat. The gold gives the color a warmer look while the silver undercoat gives an intensely red appearance to the paint without the extra warmth of the gold. A more neutral/pure red is the result when silver reflective undercoat is used. Because light reflects in different directions from objects like cars, as you move around the vehicle and see direct and reflected light from different angles, the appearance of the candy apple red paint changes as the light getting to the car and reflecting off of the car changes. This gives real "candy apple red" paint more "life" than more conventional solid red or metallic red paints used on cars, trucks and other vehicles. The original candy apple red car paint had no metallic (tiny flakes of silver metal or plastic) or pearl (tiny flakes of plastic or possibly real particles of the reflective surfaces from seashells). When you viewed the original candy apple red paint, it was simply transparent red paint with no "add ins". More recently, painters have mixed-in metallic, pearl, or metal flake with candy apple red to produce different effects in the finished paint job. Candy apple red has expanded to a whole range of "candy" colors in every shade imaginable. All follow same process of superior body preparation, primer, multiple coats of highly reflective metallic undercoat, many coats of the candy color, and multiple coats of clear paint on top. There is a big difference between real candy apple red paint and some car or locomotive color that just happened to be named candy apple red without being real candy apple red paint.

Mazda's current signature "Soul Red" and "Soul Red Crystal" are genuine examples, having a metallic silver basecoat, red high-chroma (i.e. intensely hued) transparent color coat (called "translucent" by Mazda although this incorrectly implies a milky finish) and a top clearcoat for protection.

=== Music ===
The song Candy Apple Red Impala was released on a 45 rpm record in 1962 by rock and roll musicians Little E and the Mello-Tone Three ("Little E"'s actual name was Emil O'Conner), although the bright red offered in 1962 on an Impala had a promotional name of Roman Red.

== See also ==
- List of colors
