= Jungle green =

Color

Color coordinates
- Hex triplet: #29AB87
- sRGB^{B} (r, g, b): (41, 171, 135)
- HSV (h, s, v): (163°, 76%, 67%)
- CIELCh_{uv} (L, C, h): (63, 52, 159°)
- Source: Crayola
- ISCC–NBS descriptor: Brilliant green
- B: Normalized to [0–255] (byte)

Jungle green is a color that is a rich tone of medium spring green.

The specific tone of the color jungle green called "jungle green" by Crayola, displayed at right, was formulated by Crayola in 1990.

The first recorded use of jungle green as a color name in English was in 1926.

== Variations of jungle green ==
=== Tropical rainforest ===
Tropical Rainforest

Color coordinates
- Hex triplet: #00755E
- sRGB^{B} (r, g, b): (0, 117, 94)
- HSV (h, s, v): (168°, 100%, 46%)
- CIELCh_{uv} (L, C, h): (44, 38, 163°)
- Source: Crayola
- ISCC–NBS descriptor: Moderate green
- B: Normalized to [0–255] (byte)

Displayed at right is the color tropical rainforest.

The color tropical rainforest was formulated by Crayola in 1993.

=== Amazon ===
Amazon

Color coordinates
- Hex triplet: #3B7A57
- sRGB^{B} (r, g, b): (59, 122, 87)
- HSV (h, s, v): (147°, 52%, 48%)
- CIELCh_{uv} (L, C, h): (46, 35, 143°)
- Source: Xona.com
- ISCC–NBS descriptor: Dark yellowish green
- B: Normalized to [0–255] (byte)

Displayed at right is the color Amazon (named after the specific rainforest).

The first recorded use of Amazon as a color name in English was in 1924.

=== Deep jungle green ===
Jungle Green (ISCC-NBS #165)

Color coordinates
- Hex triplet: #004B49
- sRGB^{B} (r, g, b): (0, 75, 73)
- HSV (h, s, v): (178°, 100%, 29%)
- CIELCh_{uv} (L, C, h): (28, 22, 188°)
- Source: ISCC-NBS^{[usurped]}
- ISCC–NBS descriptor: Dark bluish green
- B: Normalized to [0–255] (byte)

Displayed at right is the color deep jungle green, that tone of jungle green shown as jungle green on color sample #165 of the ISCC-NBS color list.

=== Medium jungle green ===
Jungle Green (ISCC-NBS #147)

Color coordinates
- Hex triplet: #1C352D
- sRGB^{B} (r, g, b): (28, 53, 45)
- HSV (h, s, v): (161°, 47%, 21%)
- CIELCh_{uv} (L, C, h): (20, 10, 161°)
- Source: ISCC-NBS
- ISCC–NBS descriptor: Very dark green
- B: Normalized to [0–255] (byte)

Displayed at right is the color medium jungle green, that tone of jungle green shown as jungle green in color sample #147 on the ISCC-NBS color list.

=== Dark jungle green ===
Jungle Green (ISCC-NBS #152)

Color coordinates
- Hex triplet: #1A2421
- sRGB^{B} (r, g, b): (26, 36, 33)
- HSV (h, s, v): (162°, 28%, 14%)
- CIELCh_{uv} (L, C, h): (13, 4, 166°)
- Source: ISCC-NBS
- ISCC–NBS descriptor: Blackish green
- B: Normalized to [0–255] (byte)

Displayed at right is the color dark jungle green, that tone of jungle green called jungle green in color sample #152 on the ISCC-NBS color list.

== In culture ==
Military

- In the United States Army, jungle green is the color used for the uniforms and berets of the United States Army Special Forces. (The shade of jungle green used in the uniforms and berets of the U.S. Army Green Berets is closely equivalent to the color shown above as deep jungle green.) In the Commonwealth of Nations jungle green is the color of the combat or working uniform worn in the Far East and in parts of Africa. The uniform was often called "jaygees" in Australia. Green berets are also used by the elite forces of a number of other nations—see the article on green berets. The berets used by these various elite military forces are usually a tone of jungle green or forest green.

== See also ==
- List of colors
- List of Crayola crayon colors
