= Powder blue =

Shade of blue

Color coordinates
- Hex triplet: #9EB9D4
- sRGB^{B} (r, g, b): (158, 185, 212)
- HSV (h, s, v): (210°, 25%, 83%)
- CIELCh_{uv} (L, C, h): (74, 29, 239°)
- Source: British Standard 20D41
- ISCC–NBS descriptor: Pale blue
- B: Normalized to [0–255] (byte)

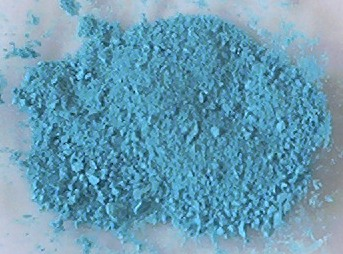

Powder blue is a pale shade of blue. As with most colours, there is no absolute definition of its exact hue. Originally, powder blue, in the 1650s, was powdered smalt (cobalt glass) used in laundering and dyeing applications, and it then came to be used as a colour name from 1894.

Smalt has a deep, dark blue hue, but powder blue nowadays is a pale cobalt blue as illustrated by the examples below, which show powder blue as defined by British and Australian Standards for paint colours along with an example of one manufacturer's actual Powder Blue paint, and a consensus definition produced by an online colour names survey in which 140,000 people took part. The sources differ on how pale or saturated a colour it is, but broadly agree on the hue.

Shades of powder blue
Australian Standard	British Standard	Dulux Trade Paint	Online survey
#BECFDD	#9EB9D4	#B2CDEB	#B1D1FC

Powder blue was also used as a colour name in English in 1774, but the exact colour is unclear: it may be a blue-grey or a dark unsaturated blue.

== Web colour ==
#B0E0E6

In contrast to the above examples, the list of X11 color names defines powderblue as a pale cyan shade, RGB(176,224,230). This is the colour displayed by a web browser if "color=powderblue" is specified in CSS. However the use of such colour names in stylesheets is deprecated, with the W3C standards body itself saying, "it is often hard to imagine what each name will look like".

== Crayola colour ==
Powder blue (Crayola)

Color coordinates
- Hex triplet: #C0D5F0
- sRGB^{B} (r, g, b): (192, 213, 240)
- HSV (h, s, v): (214°, 20%, 94%)
- CIELCh_{uv} (L, C, h): (85, 27, 243°)
- Source: Crayola
- B: Normalized to [0–255] (byte)

Displayed adjacent is the colour that is called "powder blue" in Crayola crayons. This colour was introduced for the Colors of Kindness set in 2022.

== See also ==
- List of colors
