= Cornflower blue =

Shade of blue

Cornflower blue (X11)

Color coordinates
- Hex triplet: #6495ED
- sRGB^{B} (r, g, b): (100, 149, 237)
- HSV (h, s, v): (219°, 58%, 93%)
- CIELCh_{uv} (L, C, h): (62, 83, 254°)
- Source: X11
- ISCC–NBS descriptor: Brilliant blue
- B: Normalized to [0–255] (byte)

Cornflower (Crayola)

Color coordinates
- Hex triplet: #93CCEA
- sRGB^{B} (r, g, b): (147, 204, 234)
- HSV (h, s, v): (201°, 37%, 92%)
- CIELCh_{uv} (L, C, h): (79, 42, 228°)
- Source: Crayola
- ISCC–NBS descriptor: Very light greenish blue
- B: Normalized to [0–255] (byte)

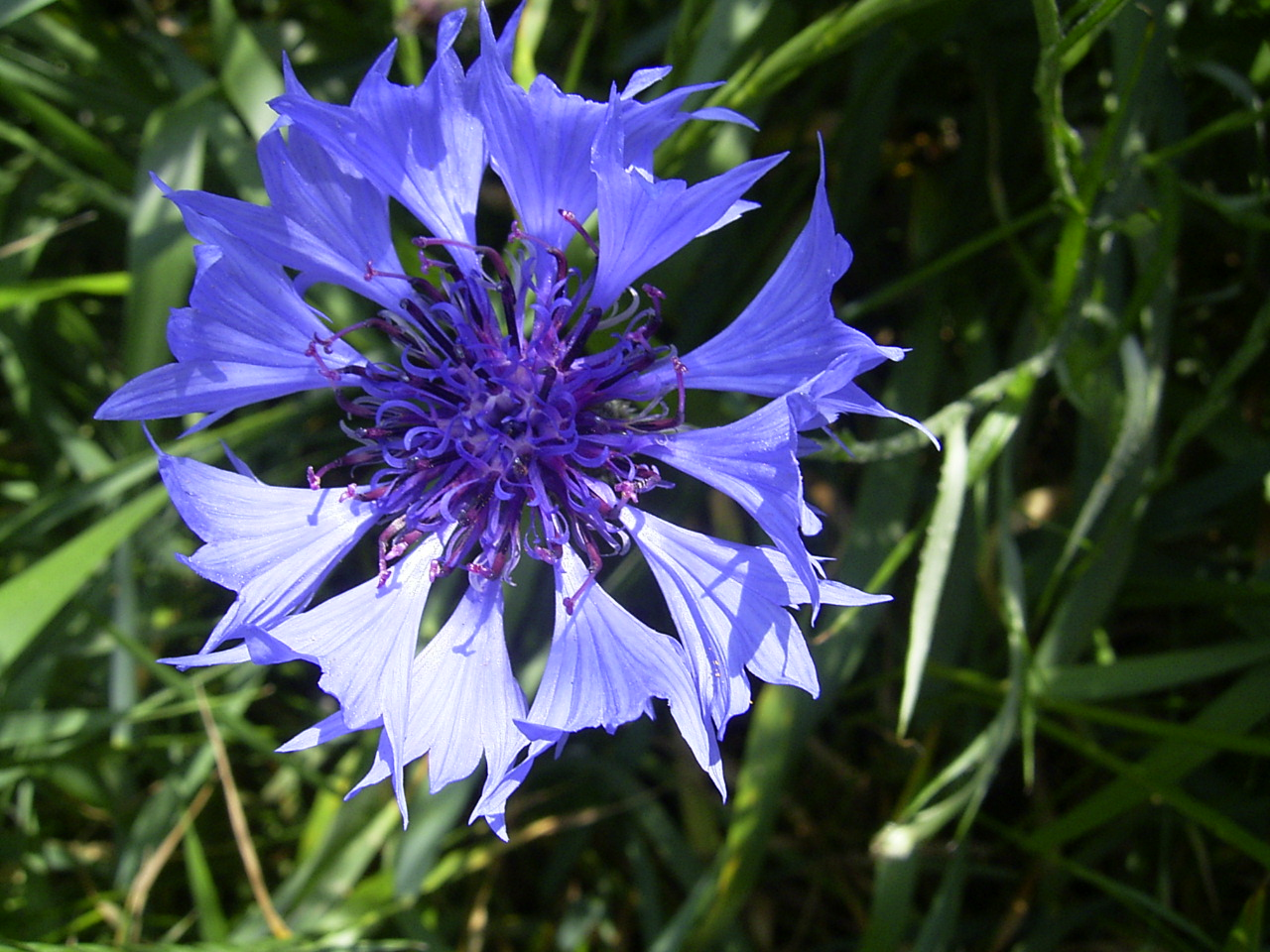
A cornflower

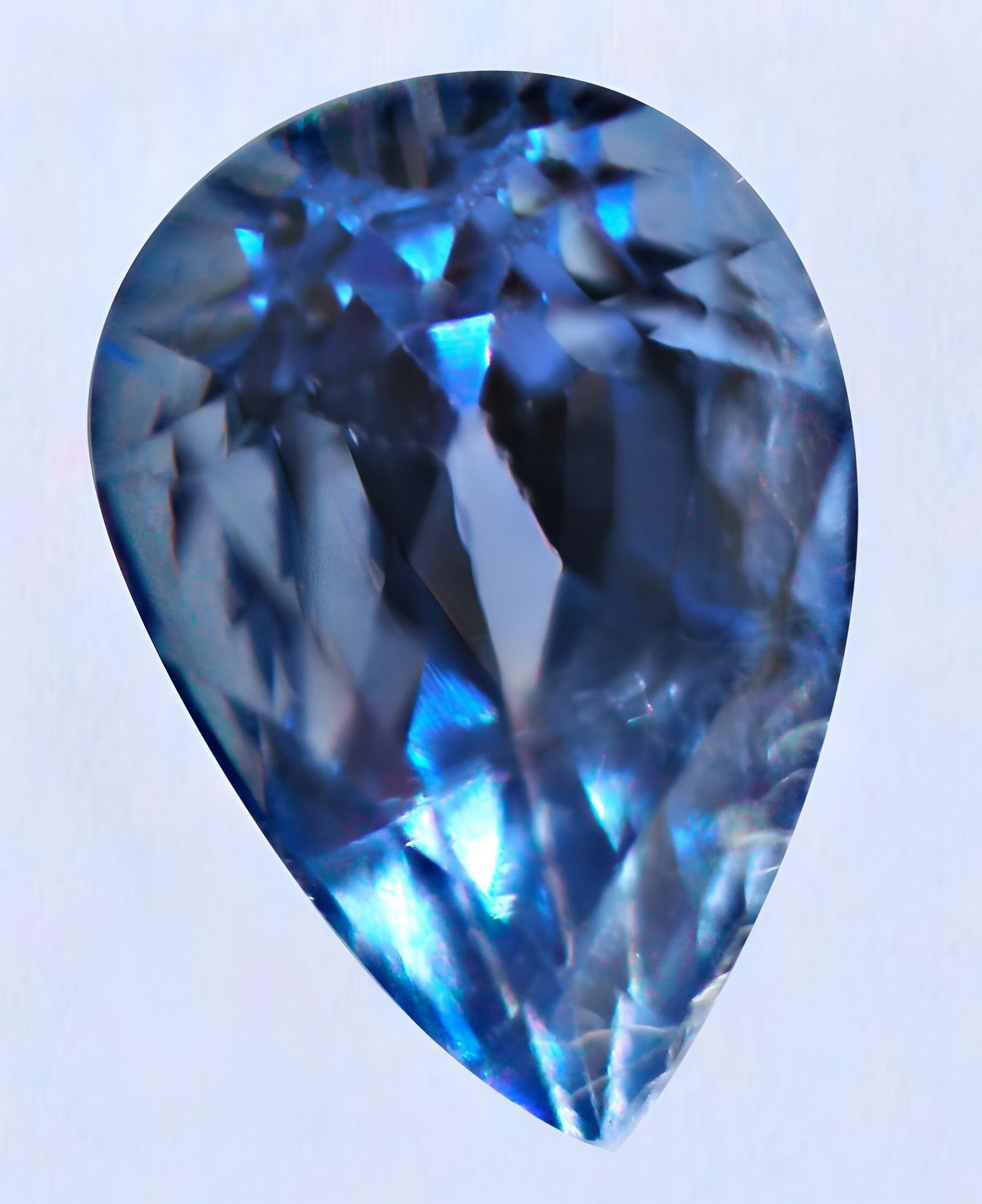
Cornflower blue sapphire

Cornflower blue is a shade of medium-to-light blue containing relatively little green. This hue was one of the favorites of the Dutch painter Johannes Vermeer.

The most valuable blue sapphires are called cornflower blue, having a medium-dark violet-blue hue.

== Uses ==
=== Robert Boyle ===
Robert Boyle reported a blue dye produced from the cornflower. This was also called Boyle's Blue and Cyan Blue. This dye color, however, was not widely commercialized.

=== X11 ===
Cornflower blue is a defined color in the X Window (X11) color scheme. As such, it is a color available as a named color for webpages.

=== HTML ===
CornFlowerBlue ( ) is an HTML color name, its hexadecimal code is #6495ED.

=== Crayola ===
Cornflower is a Crayola color with hexadecimal code #93CCEA. It was originally introduced in 1958, in the box of 48 crayons. The color is also called light cornflower.

=== RAL ===
Cornflower Blue RAL code is RAL 270 50 40

=== Microsoft XNA ===
Cornflower blue is the default clear color used in the XNA framework.

=== Bavarian Infantry Uniform Color ===
Coat color of Bavarian infantry in the early 19th Century especially found in the Napoleonic Era.

=== Democratic Socialists of America - Marxist Unity Group ===
Cornflower blue is the official color of the Marxist Unity Group caucus in the Democratic Socialists of America.

== In popular culture ==
The German popular song "Kornblumenblau" (literally "cornflower blue") humorously glorifies extreme drunkenness, blau being German slang for "drunk" and cornflower blue being an intense shade of the color.

In Chuck Palahniuk's Fight Club, Cornflower blue is a color associated with the Narrator's boss; it is revealed that he chose that particular shade of blue to highlight an icon.

== See also ==
- List of colors
- Shades of blue
