= Taupe =

Dark brown color between brown and gray

Color coordinates
- Hex triplet: #483C32
- sRGB^{B} (r, g, b): (72, 60, 50)
- HSV (h, s, v): (27°, 31%, 28%)
- CIELCh_{uv} (L, C, h): (26, 11, 47°)
- Source: ISCC-NBS
- ISCC–NBS descriptor: Dark grayish brown
- B: Normalized to [0–255] (byte)

Taupe ( /ˈtoʊp/ TOHP) is a dark gray-brown color. The word derives from the French noun taupe meaning "mole". The name originally referred only to the average color of the French mole, but beginning in the 1940s, its usage expanded to encompass a wider range of shades.

Taupe is a vague color term which may refer to almost any grayish brown or brownish gray, but true taupe is difficult to pinpoint as brown or gray.

According to the Dictionary of Color, the first use of "taupe" as a color name in English was in the early 19th century; but the earliest citation recorded by the Oxford English Dictionary is from 1911. In 1846 it was claimed that "All shades of grey are fashionable en neglige, particularly pearl grey, iron grey, and taupe."

== Description ==
Taupe (#483C32)
#483C32

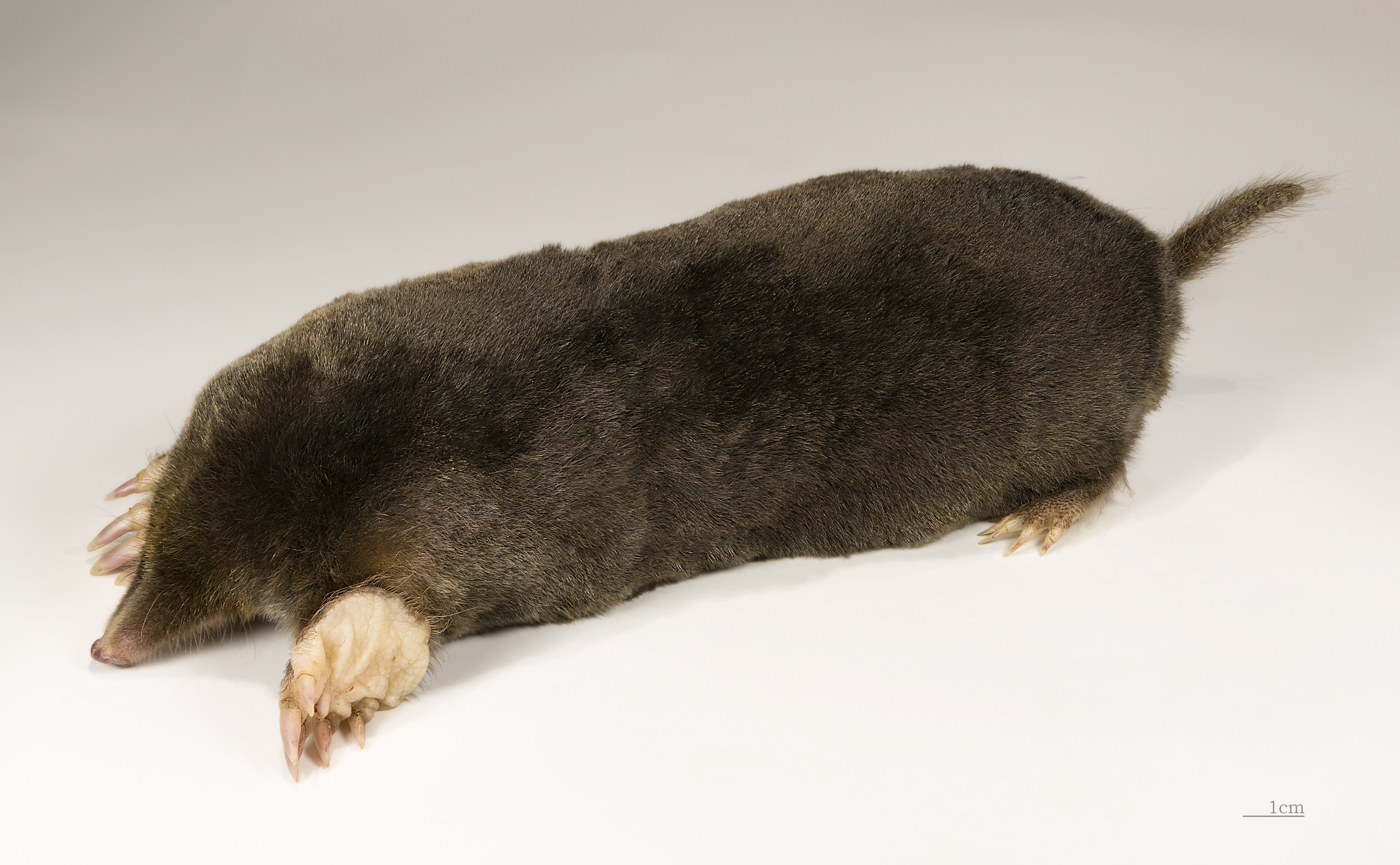
A mole

Taupe colors fall into a range from dark tan to grayish brown or brownish gray. The word derives from the French noun taupe, which in turn is from the Latin talpa, both meaning "mole" (the mammal). The name originally referred only to the average color of the French mole, but (as in the case of the colors pink and lavender), beginning in the 1940s, its usage expanded to encompass a wider range of shades.

Taupe is a vague color term which may refer to almost any grayish-brown, brownish-gray, or warm gray color. It often overlaps with tan and even people who use color professionally (such as designers and artists) frequently disagree as to what "taupe" means. Taupe itself, however, is not directly correlated with such colors as purple or pink. There is no single, generally recognized authority for such terms, but the addition of such colors can create a wider variety of shades which can benefit either art.

When viewed on a precisely calibrated monitor, the color displayed adjacent matches the color sample called taupe referenced in the 1930 book A Dictionary of Color, the world standard for color terms before the invention of computers. However, the word taupe may often be used to refer to lighter shades of taupe today, and therefore another name for this color is dark taupe.

According to the Dictionary of Color, the first use of "taupe" as a color name in English was in the early 19th century, but the earliest citation recorded by the Oxford English Dictionary is from 1911.

The normalized color coordinates for taupe are identical to dark lava, which was formalized as a color name in the ISCC–NBS system in 1955.

== Variations of taupe ==
=== Pale taupe (mouse) ===
The first recorded use of mouse as a color name in English was in 1606.

=== Light taupe ===
Light Taupe

Color coordinates
- Hex triplet: #B38B6D
- sRGB^{B} (r, g, b): (179, 139, 109)
- HSV (h, s, v): (26°, 39%, 70%)
- CIELCh_{uv} (L, C, h): (61, 39, 43°)
- Source: Crayola
- ISCC–NBS descriptor: Light brown
- B: Normalized to [0–255] (byte)

Light taupe (dark tan) is the light tone of taupe that is the color called taupe in Crayola colored pencils.

=== Mauve taupe ===
Mauve Taupe

Color coordinates
- Hex triplet: #915F6D
- sRGB^{B} (r, g, b): (145, 95, 109)
- HSV (h, s, v): (343°, 34%, 57%)
- CIELCh_{uv} (L, C, h): (46, 31, 354°)
- Source: ISCC-NBS
- ISCC–NBS descriptor: Grayish purplish red
- B: Normalized to [0–255] (byte)

Adjacent is displayed the color mauve taupe.

The first recorded use of mauve taupe as a color name in English was in 1925.

The normalized color coordinates for mauve taupe are identical to raspberry glacé, first recorded as a color name in English in 1926.

=== Rose taupe ===
Rose Taupe

Color coordinates
- Hex triplet: #905D5D
- sRGB^{B} (r, g, b): (144, 93, 93)
- HSV (h, s, v): (0°, 35%, 56%)
- CIELCh_{uv} (L, C, h): (45, 34, 12°)
- Source: ISCC-NBS
- ISCC–NBS descriptor: Grayish red
- B: Normalized to [0–255] (byte)

The color displayed adjacent is rose taupe.

The first recorded use of rose taupe as a color name in English was in 1924.

=== Sandy taupe ===
Sandy Taupe

Color coordinates
- Hex triplet: #967117
- sRGB^{B} (r, g, b): (150, 113, 23)
- HSV (h, s, v): (43°, 85%, 59%)
- CIELCh_{uv} (L, C, h): (50, 58, 58°)
- Source: ISCC-NBS
- ISCC–NBS descriptor: Moderate olive brown
- B: Normalized to [0–255] (byte)

Adjacent is displayed the color sandy taupe.

This color is also called taupe sand.

=== Taupe gray ===
Taupe Gray

Color coordinates
- Hex triplet: #8B8589
- sRGB^{B} (r, g, b): (139, 133, 137)
- HSV (h, s, v): (320°, 4%, 55%)
- CIELCh_{uv} (L, C, h): (56, 4, 323°)
- Source: ISCC-NBS
- ISCC–NBS descriptor: Medium gray
- B: Normalized to [0–255] (byte)

Displayed adjacent is the color taupe gray.

=== Deep taupe ===
Deep Taupe

Color coordinates
- Hex triplet: #7E5E60
- sRGB^{B} (r, g, b): (126, 94, 96)
- HSV (h, s, v): (356°, 25%, 49%)
- CIELCh_{uv} (L, C, h): (43, 20, 8°)
- Source: Pantone TPX
- ISCC–NBS descriptor: Grayish red
- B: Normalized to [0–255] (byte)

The color deep taupe is displayed adjacent.

The source of this color is the "Pantone Textile Paper eXtended (TPX)" color list, color #18-1612 TPX—Deep Taupe.

=== Taupe brown ===
Taupe Brown

Color coordinates
- Hex triplet: #674C47
- sRGB^{B} (r, g, b): (103, 76, 71)
- HSV (h, s, v): (9°, 31%, 40%)
- CIELCh_{uv} (L, C, h): (35, 19, 22°)
- Source: ISCC-NBS
- ISCC–NBS descriptor: Grayish reddish brown
- B: Normalized to [0–255] (byte)

The color taupe brown is a very dark shade of tan that almost appears brown and is displayed adjacent.

This is the color shown as the color taupe brown in ISCC-NBS color sample #46.

=== Taupe Beige ===
Taupe Beige

Color coordinates
- Hex triplet: #927C66
- sRGB^{B} (r, g, b): (146, 124, 102)
- HSV (h, s, v): (30°, 30%, 57%)
- CIELCh_{uv} (L, C, h): (53, 24, 51°)
- Source: ISCC-NBS
- ISCC–NBS descriptor: Grayish reddish brown
- B: Normalized to [0–255] (byte)

The color Taupe Beige color offers a palette of natural and warm colours.

This is the color shown as the color taupe brown in ISCC-NBS color sample #46.

Another name for this color is medium taupe.

== See also ==
- List of colors
