= Sunset (color) =

Shade of orange

Color coordinates
- Hex triplet: #FAD6A5
- sRGB^{B} (r, g, b): (250, 214, 165)
- HSV (h, s, v): (35°, 34%, 98%)
- CIELCh_{uv} (L, C, h): (88, 47, 56°)
- Source: ISCC-NBS^{[usurped]}
- ISCC–NBS descriptor: Light yellow
- B: Normalized to [0–255] (byte)

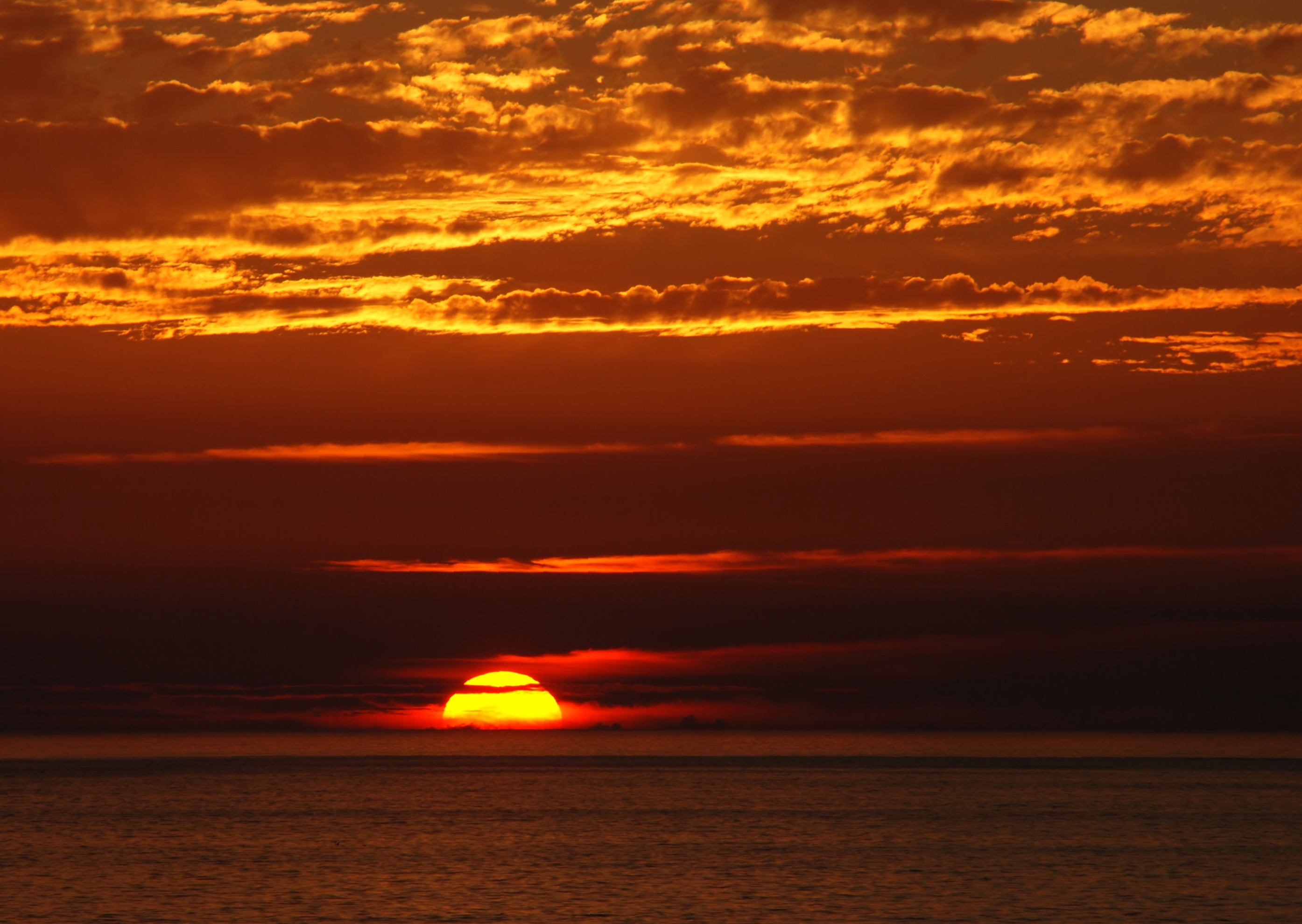
The Sun, about a minute before astronomical sunset.

The color sunset is a pale tint of orange. It is a representation of the average color of clouds when the sunlight from a sunset is reflected from them.

The first recorded use of sunset as a color name in English was in 1916.

== Origin ==
Evening twilight in Joshua Tree, California, displaying the separation of yellow colors in the direction from the Sun below the horizon to the observer, and the blue components scattered from the surrounding sky

As a ray of white sunlight travels through the atmosphere to an observer, some of the colors are scattered out of the beam by air molecules and airborne particles, changing the final color of the beam the viewer sees. Because the shorter wavelength components, such as blue and green, scatter more strongly, these colors are preferentially removed from the beam. At sunrise and sunset, when the path through the atmosphere is longer, the blue and green components are removed almost completely, leaving the longer wavelength orange and red hues we see at those times. The remaining reddened sunlight can then be scattered by cloud droplets and other relatively large particles to light up the horizon red and orange. The removal of the shorter wavelengths of light is due to Rayleigh scattering by air molecules and particles much smaller than the wavelength of visible light (less than 50 nm in diameter). The scattering by cloud droplets and other particles with diameters comparable to or larger than the sunlight's wavelengths (> 600 nm) is due to Mie scattering and is not strongly wavelength-dependent. Mie scattering is responsible for the light scattered by clouds, and also for the daytime halo of white light around the Sun (forward scattering of white light).

Sunset colors are typically more brilliant than sunrise colors, because the evening air contains more particles than morning air. Sometimes just before sunrise or after sunset a green flash can be seen.

Ash from volcanic eruptions, trapped within the troposphere, tends to mute sunset and sunrise colors, while volcanic ejecta that is instead lofted into the stratosphere (as thin clouds of tiny sulfuric acid droplets), can yield beautiful post-sunset colors called afterglows and pre-sunrise glows. A number of eruptions, including those of Mount Pinatubo in 1991 and Krakatoa in 1883, have produced sufficiently high stratus clouds containing sulfuric acid to yield remarkable sunset afterglows (and pre-sunrise glows) around the world. The high-altitude clouds serve to reflect strongly reddened sunlight still striking the stratosphere after sunset, down to the surface.

Some of the most varied colors at sunset can be found in the opposite or eastern sky after the Sun has set during twilight. Depending on weather conditions and the types of clouds present, these colors have a wide spectrum, and can produce unusual results.

== Variations of sunset ==
=== Sunglow ===
Sunglow

Color coordinates
- Hex triplet: #FFCC33
- sRGB^{B} (r, g, b): (255, 204, 51)
- HSV (h, s, v): (45°, 80%, 100%)
- CIELCh_{uv} (L, C, h): (84, 93, 63°)
- Source: Crayola
- ISCC–NBS descriptor: Vivid yellow
- B: Normalized to [0–255] (byte)

The color sunglow is displayed at right.

The first recorded use of sunglow as a color name in English was in 1924. The Crayola crayon color was formulated in 1990.

=== Sunray ===
Sunray

Color coordinates
- Hex triplet: #E3A857
- sRGB^{B} (r, g, b): (227, 168, 87)
- HSV (h, s, v): (35°, 62%, 89%)
- CIELCh_{uv} (L, C, h): (73, 73, 50°)
- Source: ISCC-NBS^{[usurped]}
- ISCC–NBS descriptor: Moderate orange yellow
- B: Normalized to [0–255] (byte)

At right is displayed the color sunray.

The first recorded use of sunray as a color name in English was in 1926.

=== Sunset orange ===
Sunset Orange

Color coordinates
- Hex triplet: #FD5E53
- sRGB^{B} (r, g, b): (253, 94, 83)
- HSV (h, s, v): (4°, 67%, 99%)
- CIELCh_{uv} (L, C, h): (61, 127, 14°)
- Source: Crayola
- ISCC–NBS descriptor: Vivid red
- B: Normalized to [0–255] (byte)

The color sunset orange is displayed at right.

Sunset orange was formulated as a Crayola color in 1997.

== Sun colors in human culture ==
Interior Design

- Sunset is popular color in interior design which is used when a pale warm tint is desired.

Sports

- Sunset orange is used on the NBA's Oklahoma City Thunder alternative jerseys introduced in the 2015-16 season. They are primarily worn on Sunday matchups.

== See also ==
- List of colors
