= Lava (color) =

Purplish shade of red

Lava
#CF1020

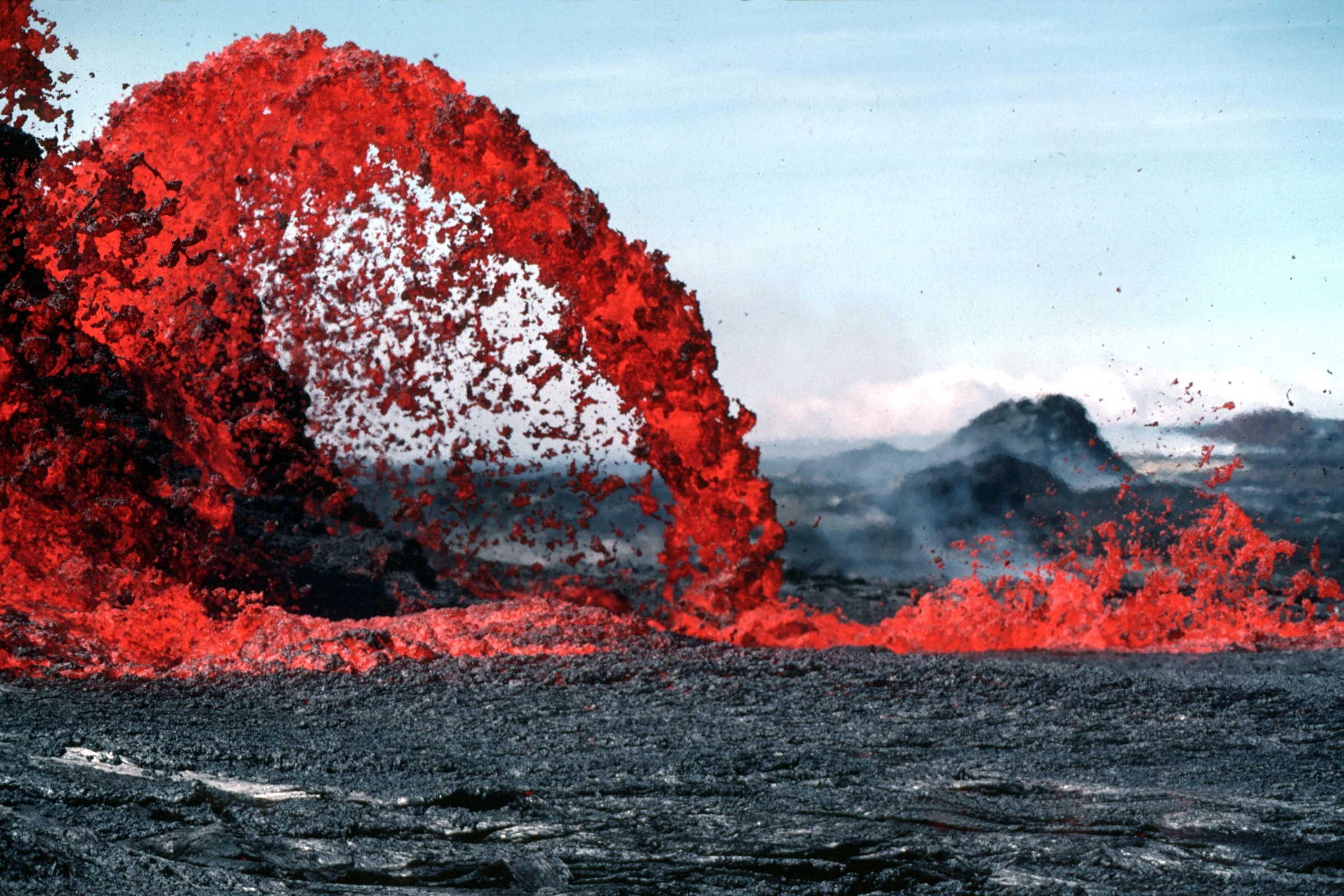
33 ft (10 m) high fountain of lava, Hawaii, United States

Lava is a color that is a purplish shade of red. It is named after the color of volcanic lava.

This is the color (color #CF1020, shown at right) of fresh lava pouring out of a volcano.

The first recorded use of lava as a color name in English was in 1891.

== Variations of lava ==
=== Dark lava ===
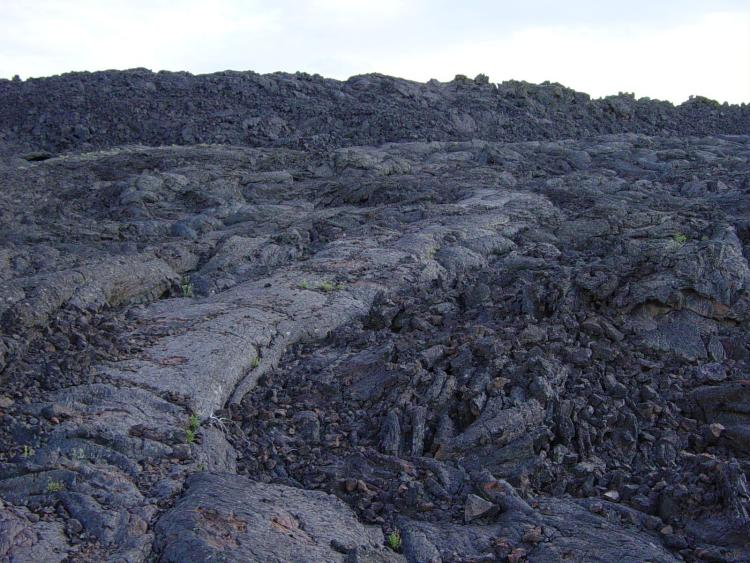
Lava that has congealed into igneous rock at Craters of the Moon National Monument in Idaho, United States

Lava (ISCC-NBS)

Color coordinates
- Hex triplet: #483C32
- sRGB^{B} (r, g, b): (72, 60, 50)
- HSV (h, s, v): (27°, 31%, 28%)
- CIELCh_{uv} (L, C, h): (26, 11, 47°)
- Source: ISCC-NBS (color sample#81)
- ISCC–NBS descriptor: Dark grayish yellowish brown
- B: Normalized to [0–255] (byte)

The color dark lava is the color of lava that has cooled and begun to congeal into igneous rock.

The normalized color coordinates for dark lava are identical to taupe, which came into use as a color name in English in the early 19th century;

== See also ==
- List of colors
