= Liver (color) =

Type of color

Color coordinates
- Hex triplet: #674C47
- sRGB^{B} (r, g, b): (103, 76, 71)
- HSV (h, s, v): (9°, 31%, 40%)
- CIELCh_{uv} (L, C, h): (35, 19, 22°)
- Source: ISCC-NBS
- ISCC–NBS descriptor: Grayish reddish brown
- B: Normalized to [0–255] (byte)

Liver is a color name for a kind of brown, first recorded as such in English in 1686. It may refer to the color of the organ.

In particular, Liver describes a dark brown color in the coats of dogs and horses.

== In dogs ==
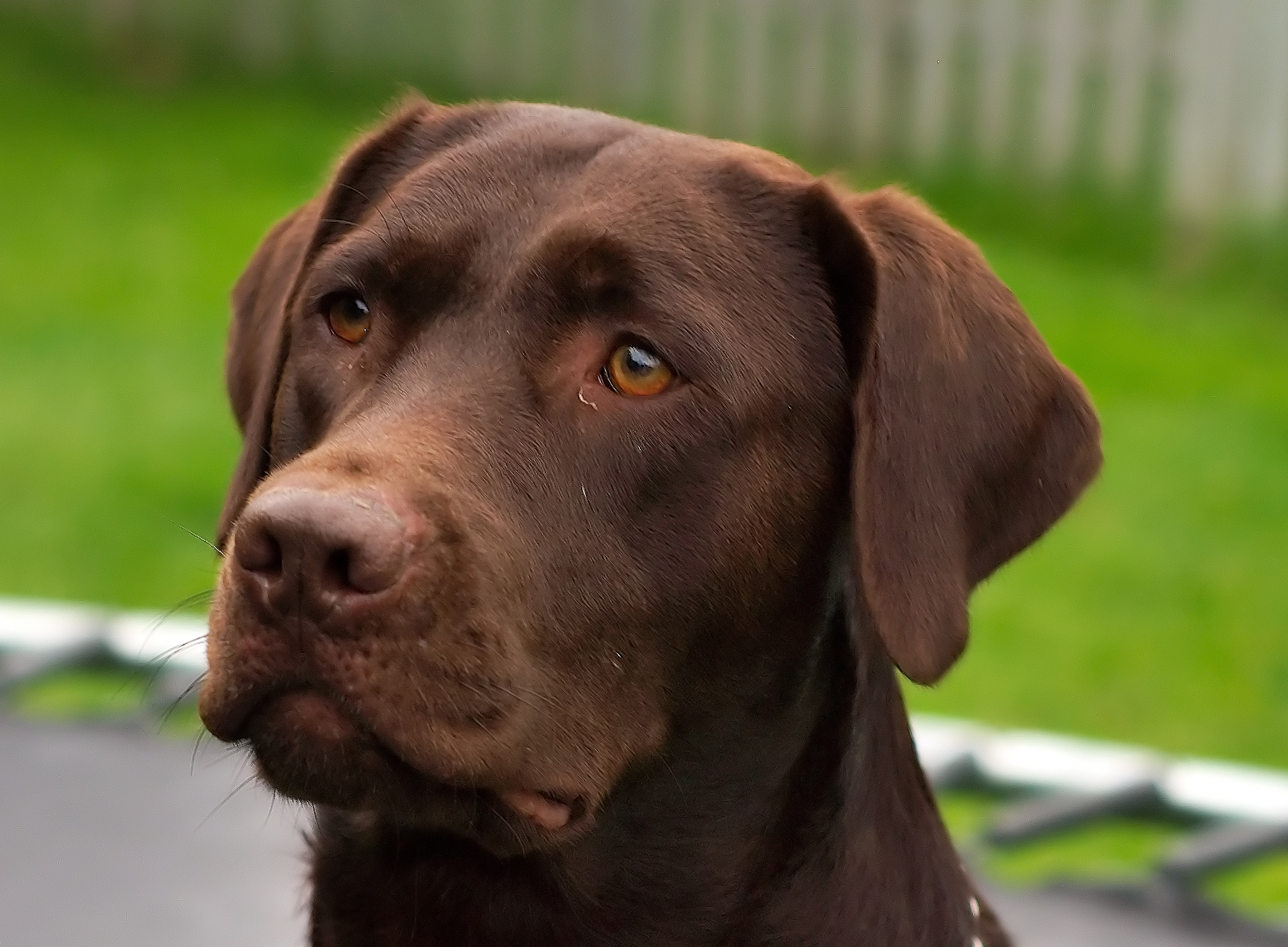
Called "Chocolate" on a Labrador Retriever, Liver shows a brown nose and yellow in the eyes

Liver (Dogs)

Color coordinates
- Hex triplet: #5D3B1A
- sRGB^{B} (r, g, b): (93, 59, 26)
- HSV (h, s, v): (30°, 72%, 36%)
- CIELCh_{uv} (L, C, h): (28, 33, 41°)
- ISCC–NBS descriptor: Dark brown
- B: Normalized to [0–255] (byte)

In dogs, the Liver color is caused by dilution of the eumelanin (black) pigment by the B locus. The gene that causes Liver is recessive, so a BB or Bb dog has normal black pigment. Only a bb dog is Liver. There are several different recessive b genes, but they all turn the coat brown. They are only distinguishable through genetic testing. Liver may also be called different names such as Brown, Chocolate, or Red. Red is a very misleading term, and should be avoided when referring to the color liver because it can be confused for phaeomelanin pigment. This second pigment is what colors all the "true red" or yellow parts of a dog.

Coloration that can be mistaken for Liver

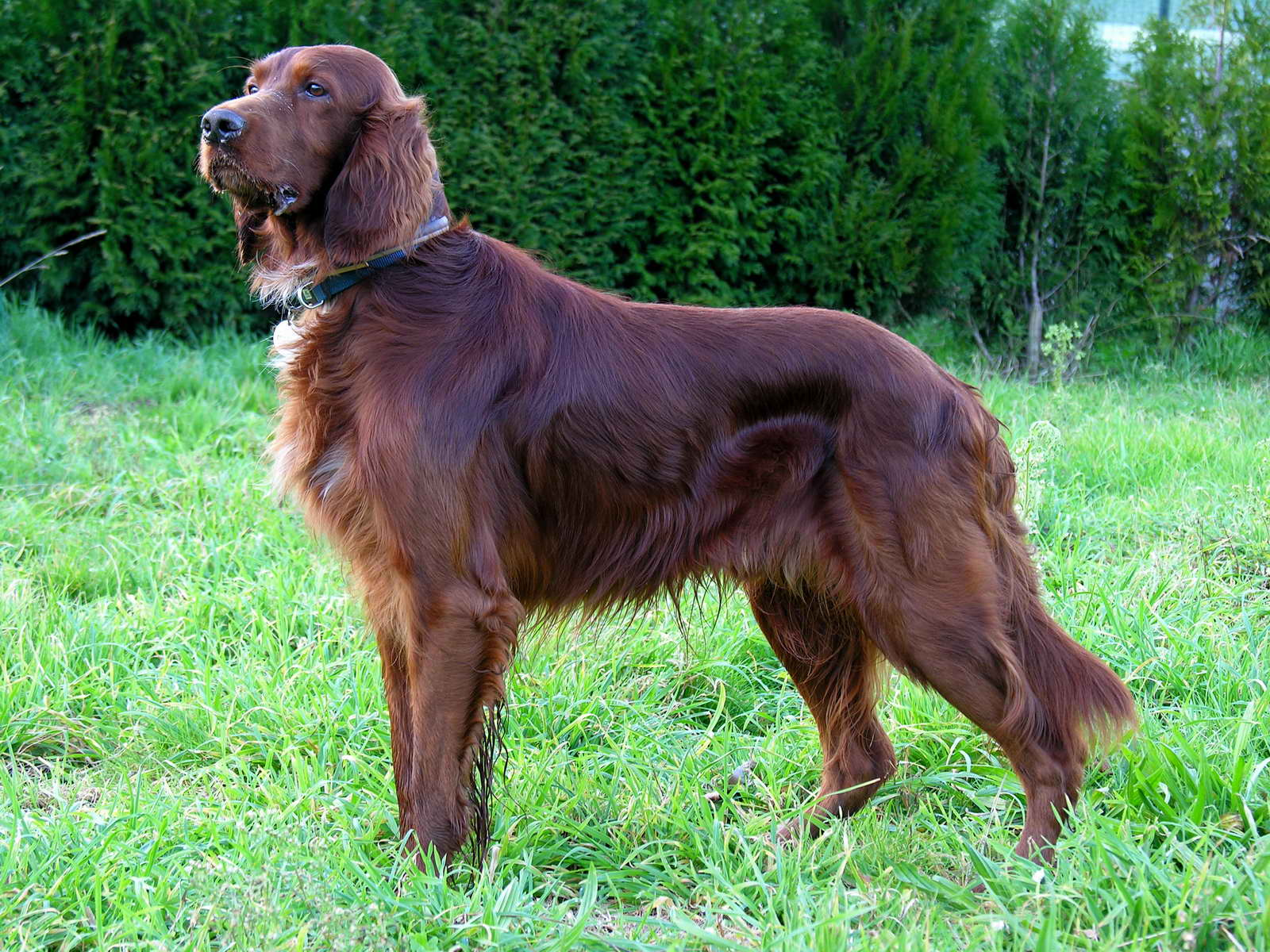
Irish Setter in a recessive red with very dark pigment

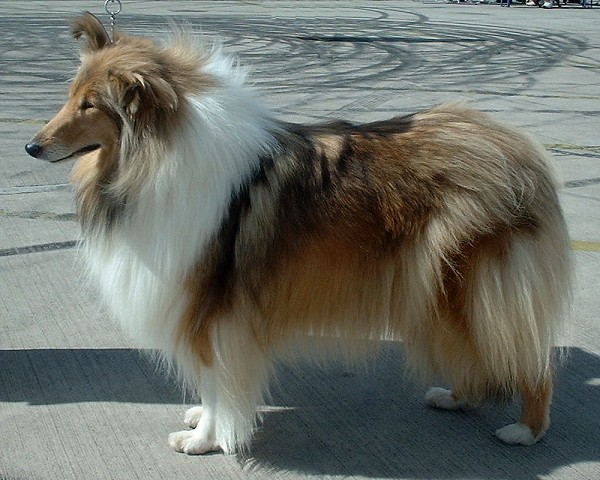
Black and Red/Yellow with the shaded sable pattern on a Rough Collie

Liver dilution can also be combined with other genes that dilute a dog's coat. The D locus dilutes black pigment to a blue-grey color usually called Blue. It is a recessive trait like Liver. When a dog has both Liver and Blue dilution, it will appear to be a light, warm-gray color known as Isabella. This is the color of Weimaraners. This color also has alternate names such as Liliac or Silver. When Liver is combined with Merle, the eumelanin (black) pigment is further diluted in random patches. This usually creates a light reddish-gray dog with dark brown patches. This color is often called "Red Merle" even though that is misleading. A more correct name would be Liver Merle or Chocolate Merle.

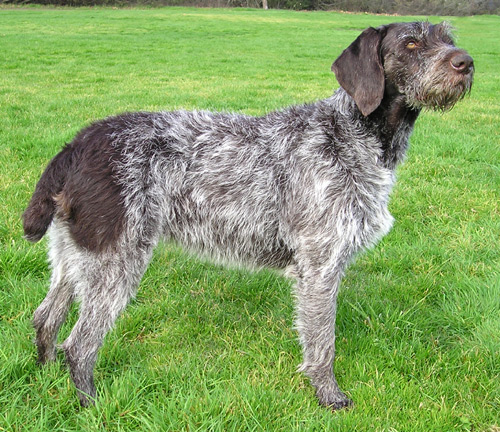
Liver on a German Wirehaired Pointer, a piebald with roaning

There are many other dog colors that can look like brown, but are not Liver. A dog that is very dark red, like an Irish Setter may sometimes appear brown. Dogs with a blend of Black and Red/Yellow fur can also look like they have brown areas. An easy way to tell if a dog is Liver or not is to look at their nose. Eumelanin (black) pigment colors a dog's nose, so a Liver dog will have a Liver colored nose. If the nose is black, the dog is not a liver. A pink nose has nothing to do with liver dilution, and will not help determine if a dog is liver or not. Liver will also dilute a dog's brown eyes to amber/yellow.

It is also possible for a dog to be a Liver, and not appear brown. A dog that is recessive red cannot produce eumelanin (black) pigment in their fur. Since Liver is a dilution of black pigment, a recessive red Liver dog will appear to be a shade of Red, Yellow, or Cream depending on the intensity of the dog's phaeomelanin (red) pigment. A recessive red Liver will still be born with a Liver nose and amber/yellow eyes. It is common for the nose of any recessive red dog to fade to pink as they grow older. Livers, like any dog, can also be covered with varying amounts of white which will hide the color of the fur.

== Liver chestnut in horses ==
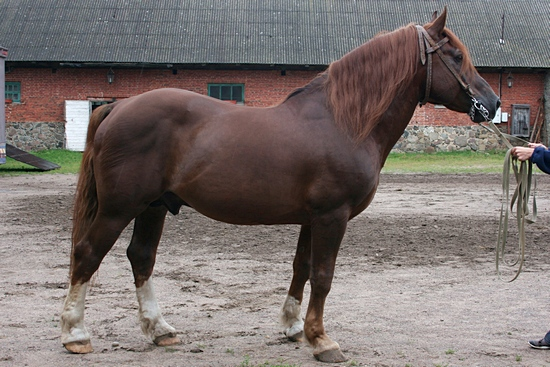
An example of a dark liver chestnut-colored horse.

Liver Chestnut (horses)

Color coordinates
- Hex triplet: #543D37
- sRGB^{B} (r, g, b): (84, 61, 55)
- HSV (h, s, v): (12°, 35%, 33%)
- CIELCh_{uv} (L, C, h): (28, 16, 26°)
- ISCC–NBS descriptor: Dark grayish brown
- B: Normalized to [0–255] (byte)

In horses, liver chestnut is a chocolate-colored chestnut horse. A dark liver chestnut has the same recessive base genetics as a regular chestnut, but the shade is a dark brown rather than the reddish or rust color more typical of chestnut. A horse that appears to be a dark liver chestnut but has a flaxen-colored mane and tail, sometimes colloquially though incorrectly called a "chocolate palomino", could be genetically chestnut but could also be a black horse manifesting the silver dapple gene. Silver dapple is a dilution gene that acts in a manner similar to the liver dilution in dogs.

The darkest liver chestnuts may be confused for black, but such horses are distinguished from other phenotypes by the absence of black hairs, and obviously brown or reddish legs, muzzles, flanks and other "soft" areas. The genotypes that determine specific varieties of chestnut are not known, but the genetics that darken the coat may have a recessive mode of inheritance. The sooty gene may also be one factor in creating the darker color, though sooty coloration is generally not evenly distributed throughout the coat. Genetic testing can distinguish a chestnut from a black or a bay horse.

Other dilution genes in horses analogous to those creating dilution shades in dogs do not create a liver color in horses. These include the dun gene, which produces a tan-colored or "blue"/gray solid colored coat and the champagne gene which tends to lighten the coat more than the mane or tail.

== Liver (organ) ==
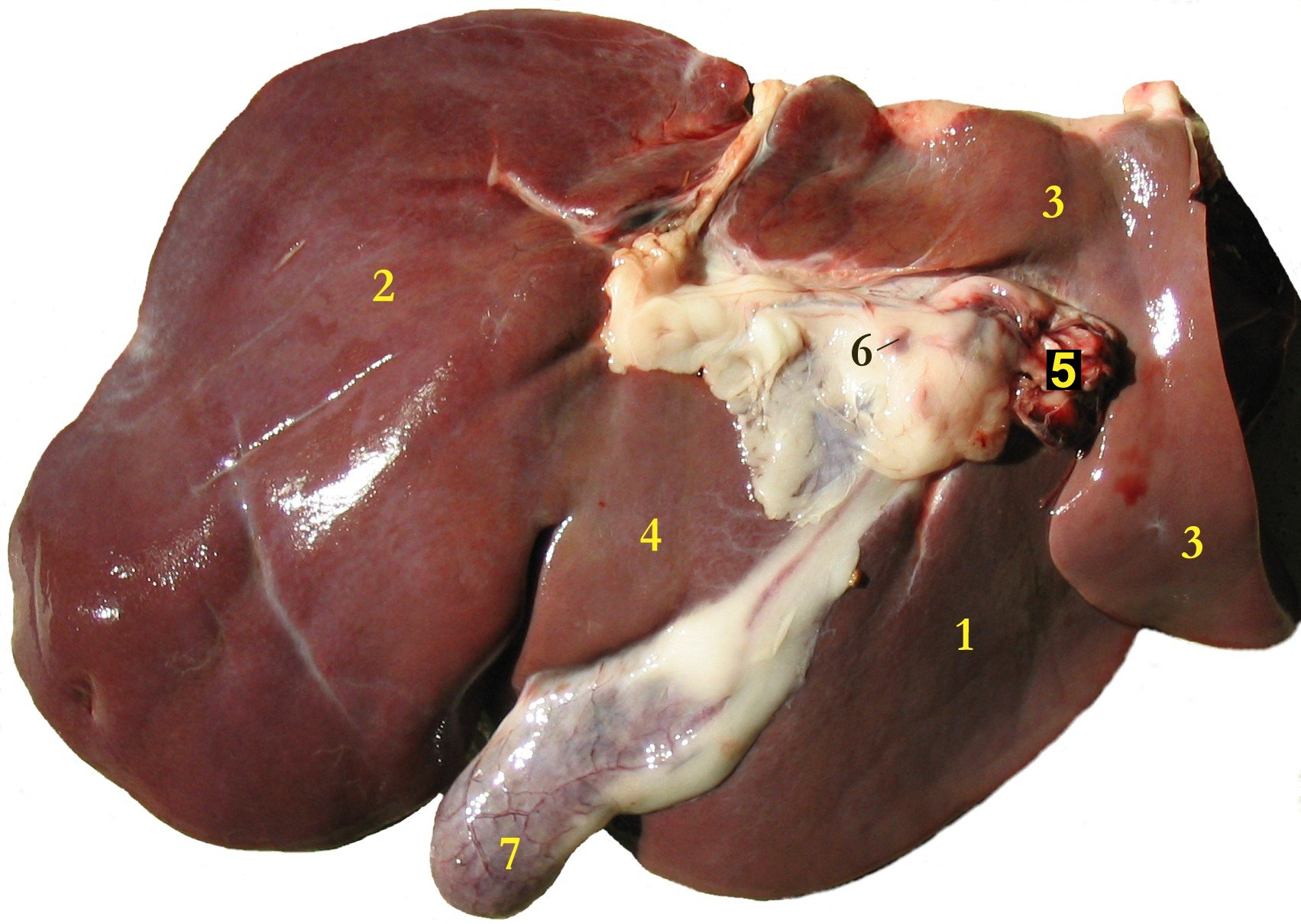
An image of a healthy sheep's Liver; human livers are much the same color

Liver Brown

Color coordinates
- Hex triplet: #603C1A
- sRGB^{B} (r, g, b): (96, 60, 26)
- HSV (h, s, v): (29°, 73%, 38%)
- CIELCh_{uv} (L, C, h): (29, 35, 40°)
- Source: Wallart
- ISCC–NBS descriptor: Deep reddish brown
- B: Normalized to [0–255] (byte)

This is the color of a healthy human liver. It may range from brown to reddish brown, and the color represented in the adjacent box is the gross average of these shades. A yellowish or greenish liver may indicate jaundice or a similar condition, a dark brown color may indicate alcohol poisoning, a black color can be seen in livers affected by Dubin–Johnson syndrome, and white or grayish tones may indicate cancer. It is unknown why the color of dogs and horses came to be known by the term "Liver", as these tones indicate an unhealthy liver.

These healthy tones usually indicate blood flow, which is why livers and other meat turn grayish brown when cooked.

== Dark liver (web) ==
Liver (web) (#534B4F)
#534B4F

At right is displayed the color dark liver (web).

This is the shade of dark liver that is the unofficial web color called liver that is traditionally used in web site design.

== In nature ==
- Liver-colored moray eel
- Liver-colored horses

== See also ==
- List of colors
- Shades of brown
- Liver
- Chestnut (coat)
