= List of colors: G–M =

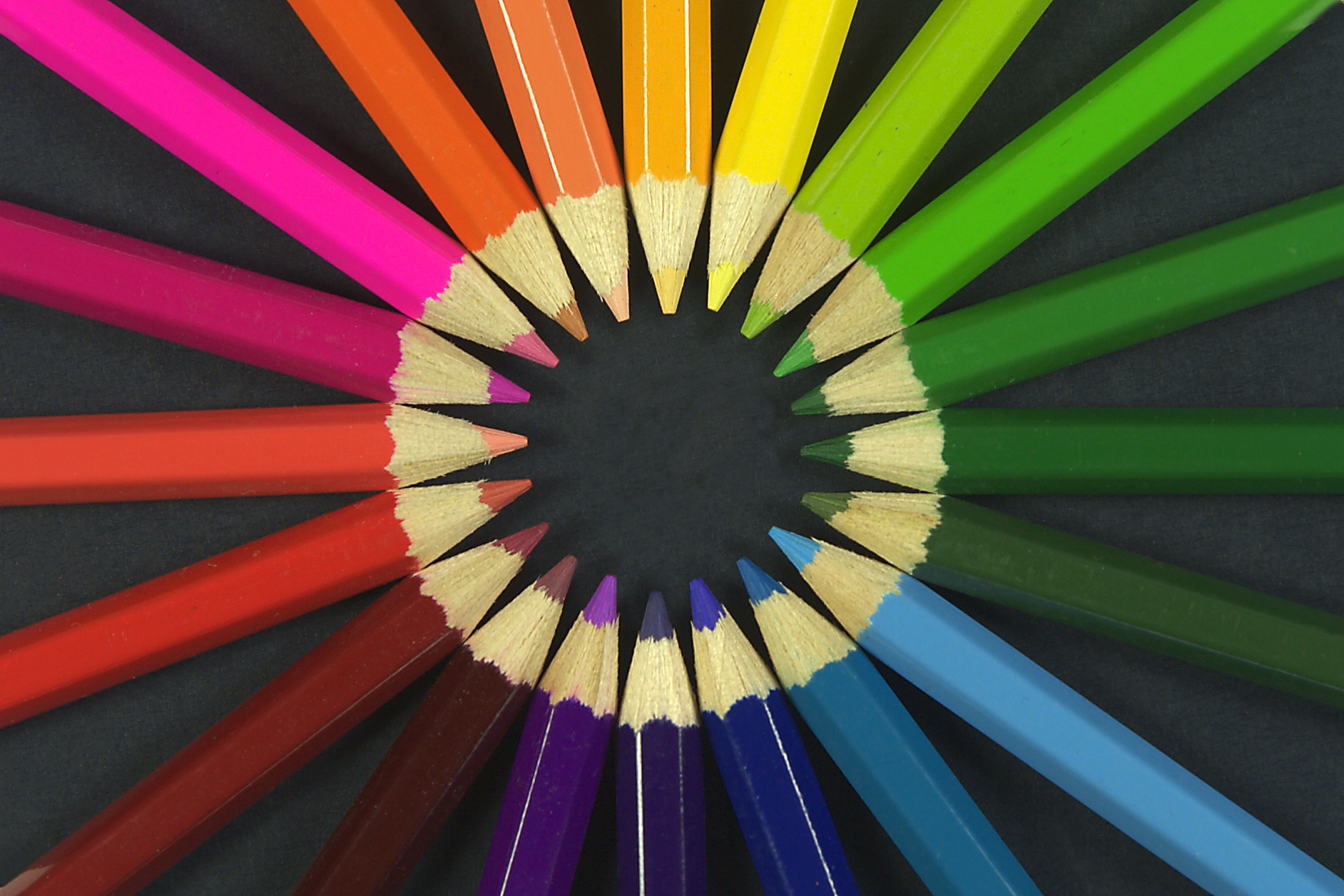
Colors are an important part of visual arts, fashion, interior design, and many other fields and disciplines.

The following is a list of colors. A number of the color swatches below are taken from domain-specific naming schemes such as X11 or HTML4. RGB values are given for each swatch because such standards are defined in terms of the sRGB color space. It is not possible to accurately convert many of these swatches to CMYK values because of the differing gamuts of the two spaces, but the color management systems built into operating systems and image editing software attempt such conversions as accurately as possible.

The HSV (hue, saturation, value) color space values, also known as HSB (hue, saturation, brightness), and the hex triplets (for HTML web colors) are also given in the following table. Some environments (like Microsoft Excel) reverse the order of bytes in hex color values (i.e. to "BGR"). Colors that appear on the web-safe color palette—which includes the sixteen named colors—are noted. (Those four named colors corresponding to the neutral greys have no hue value, which is effectively ignored—i.e., left blank.)

== Colors in alphabetical order G–M ==
Colors
Name	Hex (RGB)	Red (RGB)	Green (RGB)	Blue (RGB)	Hue (HSL/HSV)	Satur. (HSL)	Light (HSL)	Satur. (HSV)	Value (HSV)
Gainsboro	#DCDCDC	86%	86%	86%	—°	0%	86%	0%	86%
Gamboge	#E49B0F	89%	61%	6%	39°	88%	48%	93%	89%
Generic viridian	#007F66	0%	50%	40%	168°	100%	25%	100%	50%
Ghost white	#F8F8FF	97%	97%	100%	240°	100%	99%	3%	100%
Glaucous	#6082B6	38%	51%	71%	216°	37%	55%	47%	71%
Glossy grape	#AB92B3	67%	57%	70%	285°	18%	64%	18%	70%
GO green	#00AB66	0%	67%	40%	156°	100%	34%	100%	67%
Gold (metallic)	#D4AF37	83%	69%	22%	46°	65%	52%	74%	83%
Gold (web) (Golden)	#FFD700	100%	84%	0%	51°	100%	50%	100%	100%
Gold (Crayola)	#E6BE8A	90%	75%	54%	34°	65%	72%	40%	90%
Gold Fusion	#85754E	52%	46%	31%	43°	26%	41%	41%	52%
Golden brown	#996515	60%	40%	8%	36°	76%	34%	86%	60%
Golden poppy	#FCC200	99%	76%	0%	46°	100%	49%	100%	99%
Golden yellow	#FFDF00	100%	87%	0%	52°	100%	50%	100%	100%
Goldenrod	#DAA520	85%	65%	13%	43°	74%	49%	85%	85%
Gotham green	#00573F	0%	34%	25%	168°	100%	17%	100%	34.1%
Granite gray	#676767	40%	40%	40%	—°	0%	40%	0%	40%
Granny Smith apple	#A8E4A0	66%	89%	63%	113°	56%	76%	30%	89%
Gray (web)	#808080	50%	50%	50%	—°	0%	50%	0%	50%
Gray (X11 gray)	#BEBEBE	75%	75%	75%	—°	0%	75%	0%	75%
Green	#00FF00	0%	100%	0%	120°	100%	50%	100%	100%
Green (Crayola)	#1CAC78	11%	67%	47%	158°	72%	39%	84%	67%
Green (web)	#008000	0%	50%	0%	120°	100%	25%	100%	50%
Green (Munsell)	#00A877	0%	66%	47%	163°	100%	33%	100%	66%
Green (NCS)	#009F6B	0%	62%	42%	160°	100%	31%	100%	62%
Green (Pantone)	#00AD43	0%	68%	26%	143°	100%	34%	100%	68%
Green (pigment)	#00A550	0%	65%	31%	149°	100%	32%	100%	65%
Green-blue	#1164B4	7%	39%	71%	209°	83%	39%	91%	71%
Green Lizard	#A7F432	65%	96%	20%	84°	90%	58%	80%	96%
Green Sheen	#6EAEA1	43%	68%	63%	168°	28%	56%	37%	68%
Gunmetal	#2a3439	16%	20%	22%	200°	15%	19%	15%	19%
Hansa yellow	#E9D66B	91%	84%	42%	51°	74%	67%	54%	91%
Harlequin	#3FFF00	25%	100%	0%	105°	100%	50%	100%	100%
Harvest gold	#DA9100	85%	57%	0%	40°	100%	43%	100%	85%
Heat Wave	#FF7A00	100%	48%	0%	29°	100%	50%	100%	100%
Heliotrope	#DF73FF	87%	45%	100%	286°	100%	73%	55%	100%
Heliotrope gray	#AA98A9	67%	60%	66%	303°	10%	63%	11%	67%
Hollywood cerise	#F400A1	96%	0%	63%	320°	100%	48%	100%	96%
Honolulu blue	#006DB0	0%	43%	69%	203°	100%	35%	100%	69%
Hooker's green	#49796B	29%	47%	42%	163°	25%	38%	40%	47%
Hot magenta	#FF1DCE	100%	11%	81%	313°	100%	56%	89%	100%
Hot pink	#FF69B4	100%	41%	71%	330°	100%	71%	59%	100%
Hunter green	#355E3B	21%	37%	23%	129°	28%	29%	44%	37%
Iceberg	#71A6D2	44%	65%	82%	207°	52%	63%	46%	82%
Illuminating emerald	#319177	19%	57%	47%	164°	49%	38%	66%	57%
Imperial red	#ED2939	93%	16%	22%	355°	84%	55%	83%	93%
Inchworm	#B2EC5D	70%	93%	36%	84°	79%	65%	61%	93%
Independence	#4C516D	30%	32%	43%	231°	18%	36%	30%	43%
India green	#138808	7%	53%	3%	115°	89%	28%	94%	53%
Indian red	#CD5C5C	80%	36%	36%	0°	53%	58%	55%	80%
Indian yellow	#E3A857	89%	66%	34%	35°	71%	62%	62%	89%
Indigo	#6A5DFF	42%	36%	100%	245°	100%	68%	64%	100%
Indigo dye	#00416A	0%	25%	42%	203°	100%	21%	100%	42%
International Klein Blue	#130a8f	7%	4%	56%	244°	87%	30%	87%	56%
International orange (engineering)	#BA160C	73%	9%	5%	3°	88%	39%	94%	73%
International orange (Golden Gate Bridge)	#C0362C	75%	21%	17%	4°	63%	46%	77%	75%
Irresistible	#B3446C	70%	27%	42%	338°	45%	48%	62%	70%
Isabelline	#F4F0EC	96%	94%	93%	30°	27%	94%	3%	96%
Italian sky blue	#B2FFFF	70%	100%	100%	180°	100%	85%	30%	100%
Ivory	#FFFFF0	100%	100%	94%	60°	100%	97%	6%	100%
Japanese carmine	#9D2933	62%	16%	20%	355°	59%	39%	74%	62%
Japanese violet	#5B3256	36%	20%	34%	307°	29%	28%	45%	36%
Jasmine	#F8DE7E	97%	87%	49%	47°	90%	73%	49%	97%
Jazzberry jam	#A50B5E	65%	4%	37%	328°	88%	35%	93%	65%
Jet	#343434	20%	20%	20%	—°	0%	20%	0%	20%
Jonquil	#F4CA16	96%	79%	9%	49°	91%	52%	91%	96%
June bud	#BDDA57	74%	85%	34%	73°	64%	60%	60%	85%
Jungle green	#29AB87	16%	67%	53%	163°	61%	42%	76%	67%
Kelly green	#4CBB17	30%	73%	9%	101°	78%	41%	88%	73%
Keppel	#3AB09E	23%	69%	62%	171°	50%	46%	67%	69%
Key lime	#E8F48C	91%	96%	55%	67°	83%	75%	43%	96%
Khaki (web)	#C3B091	76%	69%	57%	37°	29%	67%	26%	76%
Khaki (X11) (Light khaki)	#F0E68C	94%	90%	55%	54°	77%	75%	42%	94%
Kobe	#882D17	53%	18%	9%	12°	71%	31%	83%	53%
Kobi	#E79FC4	91%	62%	77%	329°	60%	76%	31%	91%
Kobicha	#6B4423	42%	27%	14%	28°	51%	28%	67%	42%
KSU purple	#512888	31%	15%	51%	266°	55%	33%	71%	53%
Languid lavender	#D6CADD	84%	79%	87%	278°	22%	83%	9%	87%
Lapis lazuli	#26619C	15%	38%	61%	210°	61%	38%	76%	61%
Laser lemon	#FFFF66	100%	100%	40%	60°	100%	70%	60%	100%
Laurel green	#A9BA9D	66%	73%	62%	95°	17%	67%	16%	73%
Lava	#CF1020	81%	6%	13%	355°	86%	44%	92%	81%
Lavender (floral)	#B57EDC	71%	49%	86%	275°	57%	68%	43%	86%
Lavender (web)	#E6E6FA	90%	90%	98%	240°	67%	94%	8%	98%
Lavender blue	#CCCCFF	80%	80%	100%	240°	100%	90%	20%	100%
Lavender blush	#FFF0F5	100%	94%	96%	340°	100%	97%	6%	100%
Lavender gray	#C4C3D0	77%	76%	82%	245°	12%	79%	6%	82%
Lawn green	#7CFC00	49%	99%	0%	90°	100%	49%	100%	99%
Lemon	#FFF700	100%	97%	0%	58°	100%	50%	100%	100%
Lemon chiffon	#FFFACD	100%	98%	80%	54°	100%	90%	20%	100%
Lemon curry	#CCA01D	80%	63%	11%	45°	75%	46%	86%	80%
Lemon glacier	#FDFF00	99%	100%	0%	60°	100%	50%	100%	100%
Lemon meringue	#F6EABE	96%	92%	75%	47°	76%	85%	23%	96%
Lemon yellow	#FFF44F	100%	96%	31%	56°	100%	65%	69%	100%
Lemon yellow (Crayola)	#FFFF9F	100%	100%	62%	60°	100%	81%	38%	100%
Liberty	#545AA7	33%	35%	65%	236°	33%	49%	50%	65%
Light blue	#ADD8E6	68%	85%	90%	195°	53%	79%	25%	90%
Light coral	#F08080	94%	50%	50%	0°	79%	72%	47%	94%
Light cornflower blue	#93CCEA	58%	80%	92%	201°	67%	75%	37%	92%
Light cyan	#E0FFFF	88%	100%	100%	180°	100%	94%	12%	100%
Light French beige	#C8AD7F	78%	68%	50%	38°	40%	64%	37%	78%
Light goldenrod yellow	#FAFAD2	98%	98%	82%	60°	80%	90%	16%	98%
Light gray	#D3D3D3	83%	83%	83%	—°	0%	83%	0%	83%
Light green	#90EE90	56%	93%	56%	120°	73%	75%	39%	93%
Light orange	#FED8B1	100%	85%	69%	30°	98%	85%	30%	100%
Light periwinkle	#C5CBE1	77%	80%	88%	228°	32%	83%	12%	88%
Light pink	#FFB6C1	100%	71%	76%	351°	100%	86%	29%	100%
Light purple	#D8BFD8	85%	75%	85%	300°	24%	80%	12%	85%
Light salmon	#FFA07A	100%	63%	48%	17°	100%	74%	52%	100%
Light sea green	#20B2AA	13%	70%	67%	177°	70%	41%	82%	70%
Light sky blue	#87CEFA	53%	81%	98%	203°	92%	75%	46%	98%
Light slate gray	#778899	47%	53%	60%	210°	14%	53%	22%	60%
Light steel blue	#B0C4DE	69%	77%	87%	214°	41%	78%	21%	87%
Light yellow	#FFFFE0	100%	100%	88%	60°	100%	94%	12%	100%
Lilac	#C8A2C8	78%	64%	78%	300°	26%	71%	19%	78%
Lilac Luster	#AE98AA	68%	60%	67%	311°	12%	64%	13%	68%
Lime (color wheel)	#BFFF00	75%	100%	0%	75°	100%	50%	100%	100%
Lime (web) (X11 green)	#00FF00	0%	100%	0%	120°	100%	50%	100%	100%
Lime green	#32CD32	20%	80%	20%	120°	61%	50%	76%	80%
Lincoln green	#195905	10%	35%	2%	106°	89%	18%	94%	35%
Linen	#FAF0E6	98%	94%	90%	30°	67%	94%	8%	98%
Lion	#DECC9C	87%	80%	61%	44°	50%	74%	30%	87%
Liseran purple	#DE6FA1	87%	44%	63%	333°	63%	65%	50%	87%
Little boy blue	#6CA0DC	42%	63%	86%	212°	62%	64%	51%	86%
Liver	#674C47	40%	30%	28%	9°	18%	34%	31%	40%
Liver (dogs)	#B86D29	72%	43%	16%	29°	64%	44%	78%	72%
Liver (organ)	#6C2E1F	42%	18%	12%	12°	55%	27%	71%	42%
Liver chestnut	#987456	60%	45%	34%	27°	28%	47%	43%	60%
Livid	#6699CC	40%	60%	80%	210°	50%	60%	50%	80%
Macaroni and Cheese	#FFBD88	100%	74%	53%	27°	100%	77%	47%	100%
Madder Lake	#CC3336	80%	20%	21%	359°	60%	50%	75%	80%
Magenta	#FF00FF	100%	0%	100%	300°	100%	50%	100%	100%
Magenta (Crayola)	#F653A6	96%	33%	65%	329°	90%	65%	66%	97%
Magenta (dye)	#CA1F7B	79%	12%	48%	328°	73%	46%	85%	79%
Magenta (Pantone)	#D0417E	82%	25%	49%	334°	60%	54%	69%	82%
Magenta (process)	#FF0090	100%	0%	56%	326°	100%	50%	100%	100%
Magenta haze	#9F4576	62%	27%	46%	327°	39%	45%	57%	62%
Magic mint	#AAF0D1	67%	94%	82%	153°	70%	80%	29%	94%
Magnolia	#F2E8D7	95%	91%	84%	38°	51%	90%	11%	95%
Mahogany	#C04000	75%	25%	0%	20°	100%	38%	100%	75%
Maize	#FBEC5D	98%	93%	36%	54°	95%	67%	63%	98%
Maize (Crayola)	#F2C649	95%	78%	29%	44°	87%	62%	70%	95%
Majorelle blue	#6050DC	38%	31%	86%	247°	67%	59%	64%	86%
Malachite	#0BDA51	4%	85%	32%	140°	90%	45%	95%	85%
Manatee	#979AAA	59%	60%	67%	231°	10%	63%	11%	67%
Mandarin	#F37A48	95%	48%	28%	18°	88%	62%	70%	95%
Mango	#FDBE02	99%	75%	1%	46°	98%	50%	99%	99%
Mango Tango	#FF8243	100%	51%	26%	20°	100%	63%	74%	100%
Mantis	#74C365	45%	76%	40%	110°	44%	58%	48%	76%
Mardi Gras	#880085	53%	0%	52%	301°	100%	27%	100%	53%
Marigold	#EAA221	92%	64%	13%	39°	83%	52%	85%	91%
Marian blue	#00488B	0%	28%	55%	209°	100%	27%	100%	55%
Maroon (Crayola)	#C32148	76%	13%	28%	346°	71%	45%	83%	76%
Maroon (web)	#800000	50%	0%	0%	0°	100%	25%	100%	50%
Maroon (X11)	#B03060	69%	19%	38%	338°	57%	44%	73%	69%
Mauve	#E0B0FF	88%	69%	100%	276°	100%	85%	31%	100%
Mauve taupe	#915F6D	57%	37%	43%	343°	21%	47%	34%	57%
Mauvelous	#EF98AA	94%	60%	67%	348°	73%	77%	36%	94%
Maximum blue	#47ABCC	28%	67%	80%	195°	57%	54%	65%	80%
Maximum blue green	#30BFBF	19%	75%	75%	180°	60%	47%	75%	75%
Maximum blue purple	#ACACE6	67%	67%	90%	240°	54%	79%	25%	90%
Maximum green	#5E8C31	37%	55%	19%	90°	48%	37%	65%	55%
Maximum green yellow	#D9E650	85%	90%	31%	65°	75%	61%	65%	90%
Maximum purple	#733380	45%	20%	50%	290°	43%	35%	60%	50%
Maximum red	#D92121	85%	13%	13%	0°	74%	49%	85%	85%
Maximum red purple	#A63A79	65%	23%	47%	325°	48%	44%	65%	65%
Maximum yellow	#FAFA37	98%	98%	22%	60°	95%	60%	78%	98%
Maximum yellow red	#F2BA49	95%	73%	29%	40°	87%	62%	70%	95%
May green	#4C9141	30%	57%	25%	112°	38%	41%	55%	57%
Maya blue	#73C2FB	45%	76%	98%	205°	94%	72%	54%	98%
Medium aquamarine	#66DDAA	40%	87%	67%	154°	64%	63%	54%	87%
Medium blue	#0000CD	0%	0%	80%	240°	100%	40%	100%	80%
Medium candy apple red	#E2062C	89%	2%	17%	350°	95%	45%	97%	89%
Medium carmine	#AF4035	69%	25%	21%	5°	54%	45%	70%	69%
Medium champagne	#F3E5AB	95%	90%	67%	48°	75%	81%	30%	95%
Medium orchid	#BA55D3	73%	33%	83%	288°	59%	58%	60%	83%
Medium purple	#9370DB	58%	44%	86%	260°	60%	65%	49%	86%
Medium sea green	#3CB371	24%	70%	44%	147°	50%	47%	66%	70%
Medium slate blue	#7B68EE	48%	41%	93%	249°	80%	67%	56%	93%
Medium spring green	#00FA9A	0%	98%	60%	157°	100%	49%	100%	98%
Medium turquoise	#48D1CC	28%	82%	80%	178°	60%	55%	66%	82%
Medium violet-red	#C71585	78%	8%	52%	322°	81%	43%	89%	78%
Mellow apricot	#F8B878	97%	72%	47%	30°	90%	72%	52%	97%
Mellow yellow	#F8DE7E	97%	87%	49%	47°	90%	73%	49%	97%
Melon	#FEBAAD	100%	73%	68%	10°	98%	84%	32%	100%
Metallic gold	#D3AF37	83%	69%	22%	46°	64%	52%	74%	83%
Metallic Seaweed	#0A7E8C	4%	49%	55%	186°	87%	29%	93%	55%
Metallic Sunburst	#9C7C38	61%	49%	22%	41°	47%	42%	64%	61%
Mexican pink	#E4007C	89%	0%	49%	327°	100%	45%	100%	89%
Middle blue	#7ED4E6	49%	83%	90%	190°	68%	70%	45%	90%
Middle blue green	#8DD9CC	55%	85%	80%	170°	50%	70%	35%	85%
Middle blue purple	#8B72BE	55%	45%	75%	260°	37%	60%	40%	75%
Middle grey	#8B8680	55%	53%	50%	33°	5%	52%	8%	55%
Middle green	#4D8C57	30%	55%	34%	130°	29%	43%	45%	55%
Middle green yellow	#ACBF60	67%	75%	38%	72°	43%	56%	50%	75%
Middle purple	#D982B5	85%	51%	71%	325°	53%	68%	40%	85%
Middle red	#E58E73	90%	56%	45%	15°	69%	68%	50%	90%
Middle red purple	#A55353	65%	33%	33%	0°	33%	49%	50%	65%
Middle yellow	#FFEB00	100%	92%	0%	55°	100%	50%	100%	100%
Middle yellow red	#ECB176	93%	69%	46%	30°	76%	69%	50%	93%
Midnight	#702670	44%	15%	44%	300°	49%	29%	66%	44%
Midnight blue	#191970	10%	10%	44%	240°	64%	27%	78%	44%
Midnight green (eagle green)	#004953	0%	29%	33%	187°	100%	16%	100%	33%
Mikado yellow	#FFC40C	100%	77%	5%	45°	100%	52%	95%	100%
Mimi pink	#FFDAE9	100%	85%	91%	336°	100%	93%	15%	100%
Mindaro	#E3F988	89%	98%	53%	72°	90%	75%	45%	98%
Ming	#36747D	21%	45%	49%	188°	40%	35%	56%	49%
Minion yellow	#F5E050	96%	86%	31%	52°	89%	64%	67%	96%
Mint	#3EB489	24%	71%	54%	158°	49%	47%	66%	71%
Mint cream	#F5FFFA	96%	100%	98%	150°	100%	98%	4%	100%
Mint green	#98FF98	60%	100%	60%	120°	100%	80%	40%	100%
Misty moss	#BBB477	73%	71%	47%	54°	33%	60%	36%	73%
Misty rose	#FFE4E1	100%	89%	88%	6°	100%	94%	12%	100%
Moccasin	#FFE4B5	100%	89%	71%	38°	100%	86%	29%	100%
Mode beige	#967117	59%	44%	9%	43°	73%	34%	85%	59%
Mona Lisa	#FF948E	100%	58%	56%	3°	100%	78%	44%	100%
Morning blue	#8DA399	55%	64%	60%	153°	11%	60%	14%	64%
Moss green	#8A9A5B	54%	60%	36%	75°	26%	48%	41%	60%
Mountain Meadow	#30BA8F	19%	73%	56%	161°	59%	46%	74%	73%
Mountbatten pink	#997A8D	60%	48%	55%	323°	13%	54%	20%	60%
MSU green	#18453B	9%	27%	23%	167°	48%	18%	65%	27%
Mulberry	#C54B8C	77%	29%	55%	328°	51%	53%	62%	77%
Mulberry (Crayola)	#C8509B	78%	31%	61%	323°	52%	55%	60%	78%
Mustard	#FFDB58	100%	86%	35%	47°	100%	67%	65%	100%
Myrtle green	#317873	19%	47%	45%	176°	42%	33%	59%	47%
Mystic	#D65282	84%	32%	51%	338°	62%	58%	62%	84%
Mystic maroon	#AD4379	68%	26%	47%	329°	44%	47%	62%	68%

== See also ==
- Basic Color Terms: Their Universality and Evolution (book)
- Color blindness
- Colors of the rainbow
- Eye color
- Index of color-related articles
- List of colors: A–F
- List of colors: N–Z
- List of color palettes
- List of colors (compact)
- List of Crayola crayon colors
- Pantone colors
- Pigment
- Primary color
- Secondary color
- Tertiary color
- Tincture (heraldry)
- Valspar
- X11 color names
