= Lemon (color) =

Shade of yellow

Lemon (Crayola)
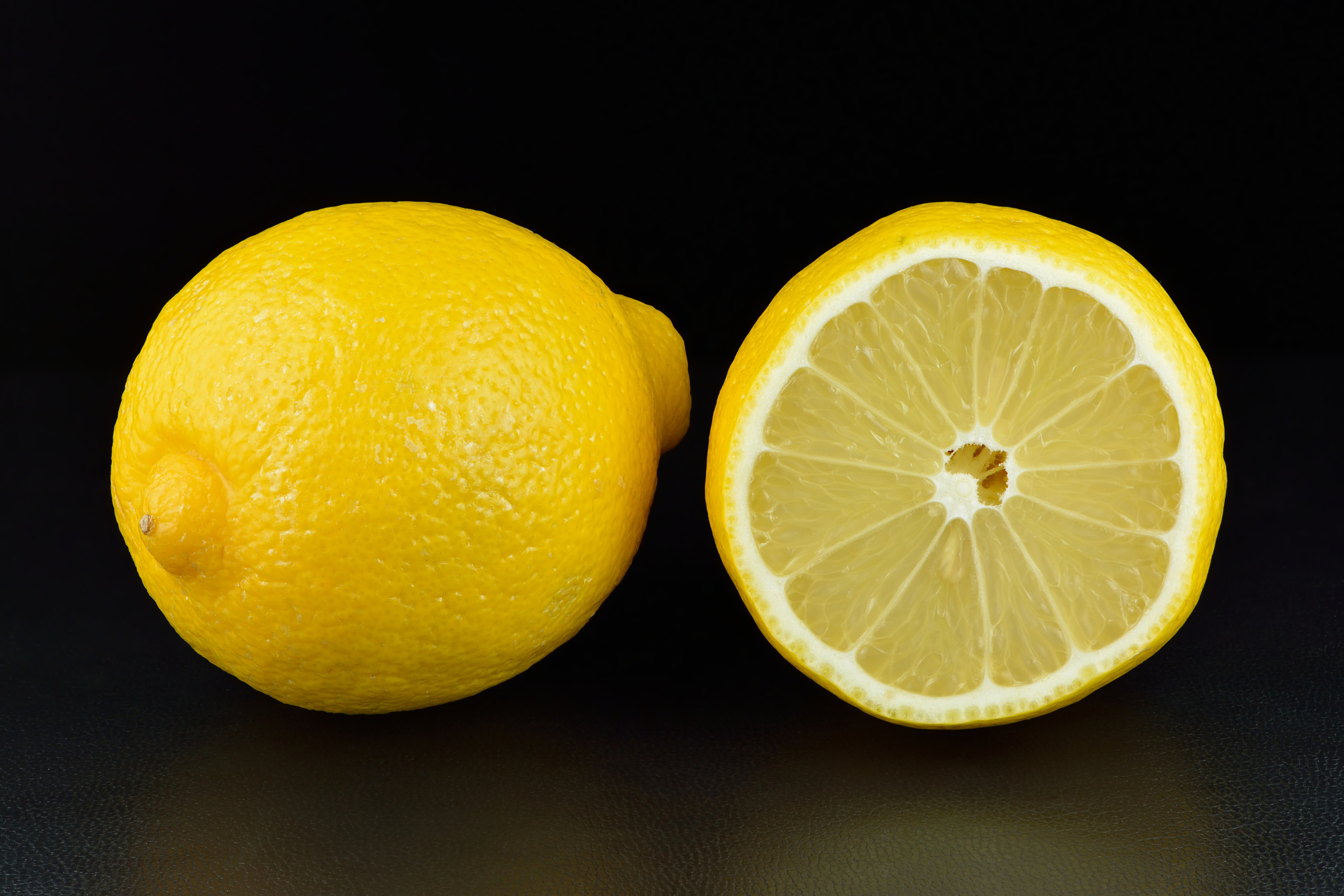
- A whole and halved lemon

Color coordinates
- Hex triplet: #FFF700
- sRGB^{B} (r, g, b): (255, 247, 0)
- HSV (h, s, v): (58°, 100%, 100%)
- CIELCh_{uv} (L, C, h): (95, 105, 83°)
- Source: Crayola
- ISCC–NBS descriptor: Vivid greenish yellow
- B: Normalized to [0–255] (byte)

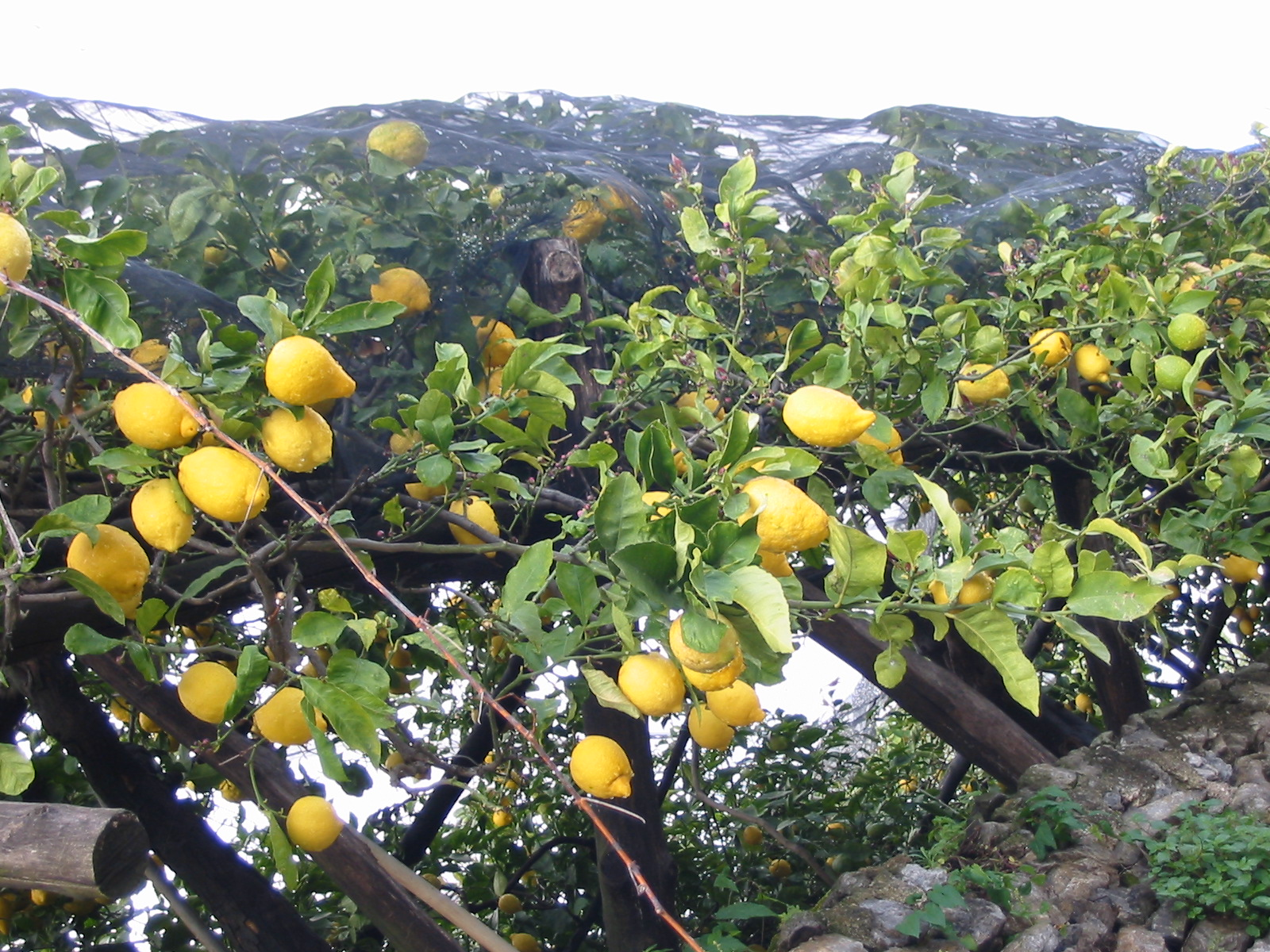
A lemon tree in Italy

Lemon or lemon-color is a vivid yellow color characteristic of the lemon fruit. Shades of "lemon" may vary significantly from the fruit's actual color, including fluorescent tones and creamy hues reflective of lemon pies and confections.

The first recorded use of lemon as a color name in English dates to 1598. In the academic regalia of the United States, the color denotes library and information science.

== Variations of lemon ==
=== Lemon Chiffon ===
Lemon Chiffon

Color coordinates
- Hex triplet: #FFFACD
- sRGB^{B} (r, g, b): (255, 250, 205)
- HSV (h, s, v): (54°, 20%, 100%)
- CIELCh_{uv} (L, C, h): (98, 34, 81°)
- Source: X11
- ISCC–NBS descriptor: Pale greenish yellow
- B: Normalized to [0–255] (byte)

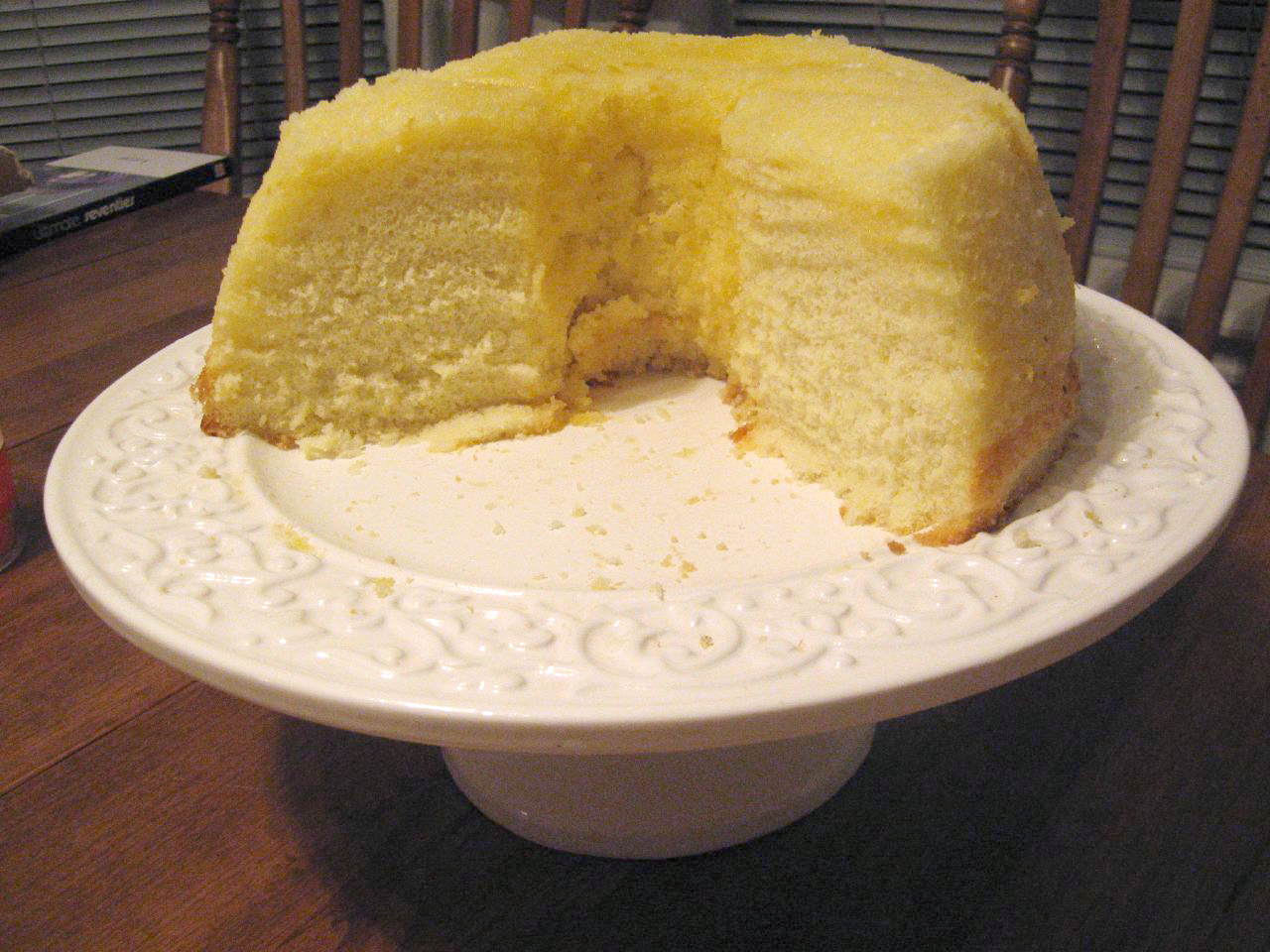
A lemon chiffon cake

Lemon chiffon is the X11 color and web color lemonchiffon. It was formulated in 1987 when it was first introduced as a named color in the X Window System. After the invention of the World Wide Web in 1991, these colors became known as the X11 web colors.

=== Lemon meringue ===
Lemon Meringue

Color coordinates
- Hex triplet: #F6EABE
- sRGB^{B} (r, g, b): (246, 234, 190)
- HSV (h, s, v): (47°, 23%, 96%)
- CIELCh_{uv} (L, C, h): (93, 35, 74°)
- Source: Pantone TPX
- ISCC–NBS descriptor: Pale greenish yellow
- B: Normalized to [0–255] (byte)

Displayed at right is the color lemon meringue.

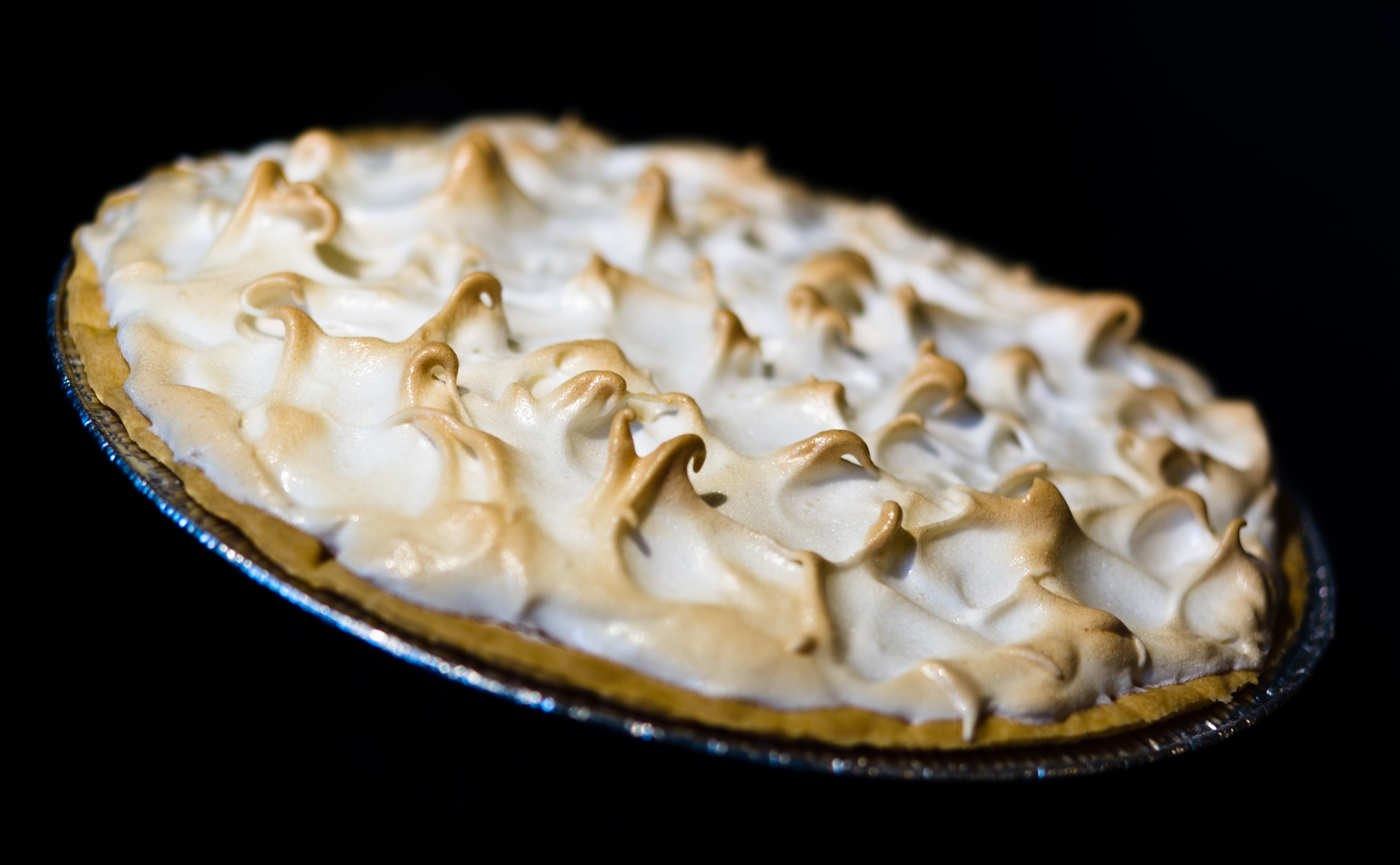
Lemon meringue pie

The source of this color is the "Pantone Textile Paper eXtended (TPX)" color list, color #12-0711 TPX—Lemon Meringue.

=== Lemon glacier ===
Lemon Glacier

Color coordinates
- Hex triplet: #FDFF00
- sRGB^{B} (r, g, b): (253, 255, 0)
- HSV (h, s, v): (60°, 100%, 100%)
- CIELCh_{uv} (L, C, h): (97, 107, 87°)
- Source: Crayola
- ISCC–NBS descriptor: Vivid greenish yellow
- B: Normalized to [0–255] (byte)

Lemon glacier is a fluorescent color, displayed in non-fluorescent form at the right.

The color lemon glacier was released by Crayola in 2009 in the extreme twistable crayons. This color is very slightly greenish looking to the naked eye (just barely detectable)--as can be seen in its color box, its green code is very slightly larger than its red code.

=== Luis lemon ===
Luis Lemon

Color coordinates
- Hex triplet: #E9FF36
- sRGB^{B} (r, g, b): (233, 255, 54)
- HSV (h, s, v): (67°, 79%, 100%)
- CIELCh_{uv} (L, C, h): (96, 102, 94°)
- Source: Model's Own
- ISCC–NBS descriptor: Vivid yellow green
- B: Normalized to [0–255] (byte)

Luis Lemon is a fluorescent color, displayed in non-fluorescent form at the right.

Luis Lemon is one of Models Own's ice neon nail polish color sets. It is a variant of Laser Lemon below.

=== Laser lemon ===
Laser Lemon

Color coordinates
- Hex triplet: #FFFF66
- sRGB^{B} (r, g, b): (255, 255, 102)
- HSV (h, s, v): (60°, 60%, 100%)
- CIELCh_{uv} (L, C, h): (98, 90, 86°)
- Source: Crayola
- ISCC–NBS descriptor: Brilliant greenish yellow
- B: Normalized to [0–255] (byte)

Laser lemon is a fluorescent color, displayed in non-fluorescent form at the right.

The color laser lemon was named by Crayola in 1990. Before that, from its formulation in 1972 to 1990, it had been incorrectly been named chartreuse. In actuality, a chartreuse color is one in which the green hex code has a slightly higher value than the red hex code in the RGB values of the color.

=== Lemon yellow ===
Lemon Yellow

Color coordinates
- Hex triplet: #FFF44F
- sRGB^{B} (r, g, b): (255, 244, 79)
- HSV (h, s, v): (56°, 69%, 100%)
- CIELCh_{uv} (L, C, h): (95, 93, 81°)
- Source: Encycolorpedia
- ISCC–NBS descriptor: Vivid greenish yellow
- B: Normalized to [0–255] (byte)

The color lemon yellow is shown at right.

Lemon yellow was a Crayola color from 1949 to 1990.

=== Bitter lemon ===
Bitter Lemon

Color coordinates
- Hex triplet: #CAE00D
- sRGB^{B} (r, g, b): (202, 224, 13)
- HSV (h, s, v): (66°, 94%, 88%)
- CIELCh_{uv} (L, C, h): (85, 95, 95°)
- Source: Xona.com
- ISCC–NBS descriptor: Vivid yellow green
- B: Normalized to [0–255] (byte)

Displayed at right is the color bitter lemon.

The first use of the color name bitter lemon was in 2001, when it was formulated as one of the colors on the Xona.com Color List.

=== Citron ===
Citron

Color coordinates
- Hex triplet: #DDD06A
- sRGB^{B} (r, g, b): (221, 208, 106)
- HSV (h, s, v): (53°, 52%, 87%)
- CIELCh_{uv} (L, C, h): (83, 67, 78°)
- Source: Xona.com
- ISCC–NBS descriptor: Strong greenish yellow
- B: Normalized to [0–255] (byte)

Displayed at right is the color citron.

The name has been used since at least the 1920s for an equal mix of orange and green pigments.

"Citron" is the French word for "lemon". This dark tone of lemon was formulated for use in interior design and fabric design.

=== Lemon curry ===
Lemon Curry

Color coordinates
- Hex triplet: #CCA01D
- sRGB^{B} (r, g, b): (204, 160, 29)
- HSV (h, s, v): (45°, 86%, 80%)
- CIELCh_{uv} (L, C, h): (68, 78, 61°)
- Source: Pantone TPX
- ISCC–NBS descriptor: Deep yellow
- B: Normalized to [0–255] (byte)

Displayed at right is the color lemon curry.

The source of this color is the "Pantone Textile Paper eXtended (TPX)" color list, color #15-0751 TPX—Lemon Curry.

=== Deep lemon ===
Deep Lemon

Color coordinates
- Hex triplet: #F5C71A
- sRGB^{B} (r, g, b): (245, 199, 26)
- HSV (h, s, v): (47°, 89%, 96%)
- CIELCh_{uv} (L, C, h): (82, 93, 65°)
- Source: Pantone TPX
- ISCC–NBS descriptor: Strong yellow
- B: Normalized to [0–255] (byte)

Displayed at right is the color deep lemon.

Deep lemon is the deep tone of lemon that is called "lemon" by Pantone.

The source of this color is the "Pantone Textile Paper eXtended (TPX)" color list, color #13-0752 TPX—Lemon.

== See also ==
- RAL 1012 Lemon yellow
- List of colors
