= List of colors by shade =

This is a list of colors sorted by shade.

== Colors with shades and tints of that hue ==
=== Red ===
Red is any of a number of similar colors evoked by light, consisting predominantly of the longest wavelengths discernible by the human eye, in the wavelength range of roughly 625–750 nm. It is considered one of the additive primary colors.

=== Orange ===
Orange is the color in the visible spectrum between red and yellow with a wavelength around 585 – 620 nm. In the HSV color space, it has a hue of around 30°.

=== Yellow ===
Yellow is the color of light with wavelengths predominantly in the range of roughly 570–580 nm. In the HSV color space, it has a hue of around 60°. It is considered one of the subtractive primary colors.

=== Green ===
Green is a color, the perception of which is evoked by light having a spectrum dominated by energy with a wavelength of roughly 520–570 nm. It is considered one of the additive primary colors.

=== Cyan ===
Cyan is any of the colors in the blue-green range of the visible spectrum, i.e., between approximately 490 and 520 nm. It is considered one of the main subtractive primary colors. Cyan is sometimes considered green or blue because of the way it appears.

=== Blue ===
Blue is a color, the perception of which is evoked by light having a spectrum dominated by energy with a wavelength of roughly 440–490 nm. It is considered one of the additive primary colors.

=== Indigo ===
Indigo is a color, the perception of which is evoked by light having a spectrum dominated by energy with a wavelength of roughly 420-450 nm.

=== Violet and purple ===
Violet refers to any color perceptually evoked by light with a predominant wavelength of roughly 380–450 nm. Tones of violet tending towards the blue are called indigo. Purple colors are colors that are various blends of violet or blue light with red light.

=== Magenta ===
Magenta is variously defined as a purplish-red, reddish-purple, or a mauvish–crimson color. On color wheels of the RGB and CMY color models, it is located midway between red and blue, opposite green. Complements of magenta are evoked by light having a spectrum dominated by energy with a wavelength of roughly 500–530 nm. It is considered one of the subtractive primary colors.

=== Pink ===
Pink is any of a number of similar colors evoked by light, consisting predominantly of a combination of both the longest and shortest wavelengths discernible by the human eye, in the wavelength ranges of roughly 625–750 nm and 380-490 nm.

=== Brown ===
Brown colors are dark or muted shades of reds, oranges, and yellows. Browns are sometimes produced by mixing two complementary colors from the RYB model (combining all three primary colors). In theory, such combinations should produce black, but in practice (because of non-ideal pigments), they do not. The color brown can also be made if multiple paint colors are added to each other.

=== White ===
White is the lightest color and a balanced additive combination of all the wavelengths of the visible light spectrum, or of a pair of complementary colors, or of three or more colors, such as additive primary colors. It is a neutral or achromatic color (without chroma), like black and gray.

=== Gray ===
Achromatic grays are colors between black and white (without chroma). Chromatic grays can be thought as achromatic grays mixed with warm hues such as yellow (warm grays) or cool hues such as azure (cool grays). This gray color template includes both achromatic and chromatic grays.

=== Black ===
Black is the darkest color, and the result of the absence or complete absorption of light. Like white and gray, it is an achromatic color (a color without chroma).

== See also ==
- Basic Color Terms: Their Universality and Evolution (book)
- Color blindness
- Colors of the rainbow
- Eye color
- Index of color-related articles
- List of colors: A–F
- List of colors: G–M
- List of colors: N–Z
- List of color palettes
- List of colors (compact)
- List of Crayola crayon colors
- Pantone colors
- Pigments
- Primary color
- Secondary color
- Tertiary color
- Tincture (heraldry)
- X11 color names
- Web colors
