= Mahogany (color) =

Reddish-brown color

Color coordinates
- Hex triplet: #C04000
- sRGB^{B} (r, g, b): (192, 64, 0)
- HSV (h, s, v): (20°, 100%, 75%)
- CIELCh_{uv} (L, C, h): (45, 111, 20°)
- Source: Maerz and Paul
- ISCC–NBS descriptor: Strong yellowish brown
- B: Normalized to [0–255] (byte)

Mahogany is a reddish-brown color. It is approximately the color of the wood mahogany. However, the wood itself, like most woods, is not uniformly the same color and is not recognized as a color by most.

The first recorded use of mahogany as a color name in English was in 1737.

== Variations of mahogany ==
=== Mahogany red ===
Mahogany (Crayola)

Color coordinates
- Hex triplet: #CA3435
- sRGB^{B} (r, g, b): (202, 52, 53)
- HSV (h, s, v): (0°, 74%, 79%)
- CIELCh_{uv} (L, C, h): (46, 117, 12°)
- Source: Crayola
- ISCC–NBS descriptor: Strong red
- B: Normalized to [0–255] (byte)

Mahogany red is equivalent to the color called mahogany in Crayola crayons. "Mahogany" was made a Crayola color in 1949.

The first recorded use of mahogany red as a color name in English was in 1843.

=== Mahogany brown ===
Mahogany brown (RAL 8016)

Color coordinates
- Hex triplet: #4C2B20
- sRGB^{B} (r, g, b): (76, 43, 32)
- HSV (h, s, v): (15°, 58%, 30%)
- CIELCh_{uv} (L, C, h): (21, 23, 26°)
- Source: RAL Color Chart
- ISCC–NBS descriptor: Strong red
- B: Normalized to [0–255] (byte)

Mahogany brown is one of RAL colors.

Mahogany tints and shades
Name	Color	Hex Triplet	RGB
Mahogany		#C04000	192	64	0
Mahogany-VY LT		#FFBEA4	255	190	164
Mahogany-LT		#DD6D5B	221	109	91
Mahogany-MD		#D16654	209	102	84
Mahogany-DK		#9D3C27	157	60	39
Mahogany-VY DK		#8F3926	143	57	38

== Mahogany in media ==
=== Video games ===
- In Pokémon, there is a village called Mahogany Town.

== See also ==
- List of colors

== General and cited references ==
Reference for mahogany tints and shades chart:

- "RGB values for DMC floss". Archived from the original on April 24, 2008.
