= Kobicha =

Dark brown color

Color coordinates
- Hex triplet: #6B4423
- sRGB^{B} (r, g, b): (107, 68, 35)
- HSV (h, s, v): (28°, 67%, 42%)
- CIELCh_{uv} (L, C, h): (33, 37, 39°)
- Source: JTC
- ISCC–NBS descriptor: Strong brown
- B: Normalized to [0–255] (byte)

The color kobicha (媚茶) is one of the Japanese traditional colors that has been in use since 660 CE in the form of various dyes used in designing kimono.

The name kobicha comes from the Japanese for the colour of a type of kelp tea, but the word was often used as a synonym for a form of flattery in a curious parallel with the English usage brown nosing.

== See also ==
- List of colors
