= Mikado yellow =

Color shade

Mikado Yellow

Color coordinates
- Hex triplet: #FFC40C
- sRGB^{B} (r, g, b): (255, 196, 12)
- HSV (h, s, v): (45°, 95%, 100%)
- CIELCh_{uv} (L, C, h): (82, 98, 60°)
- Source: mercurystuff.com
- ISCC–NBS descriptor: Vivid yellow
- B: Normalized to [0–255] (byte)

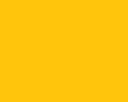
Mikado yellow

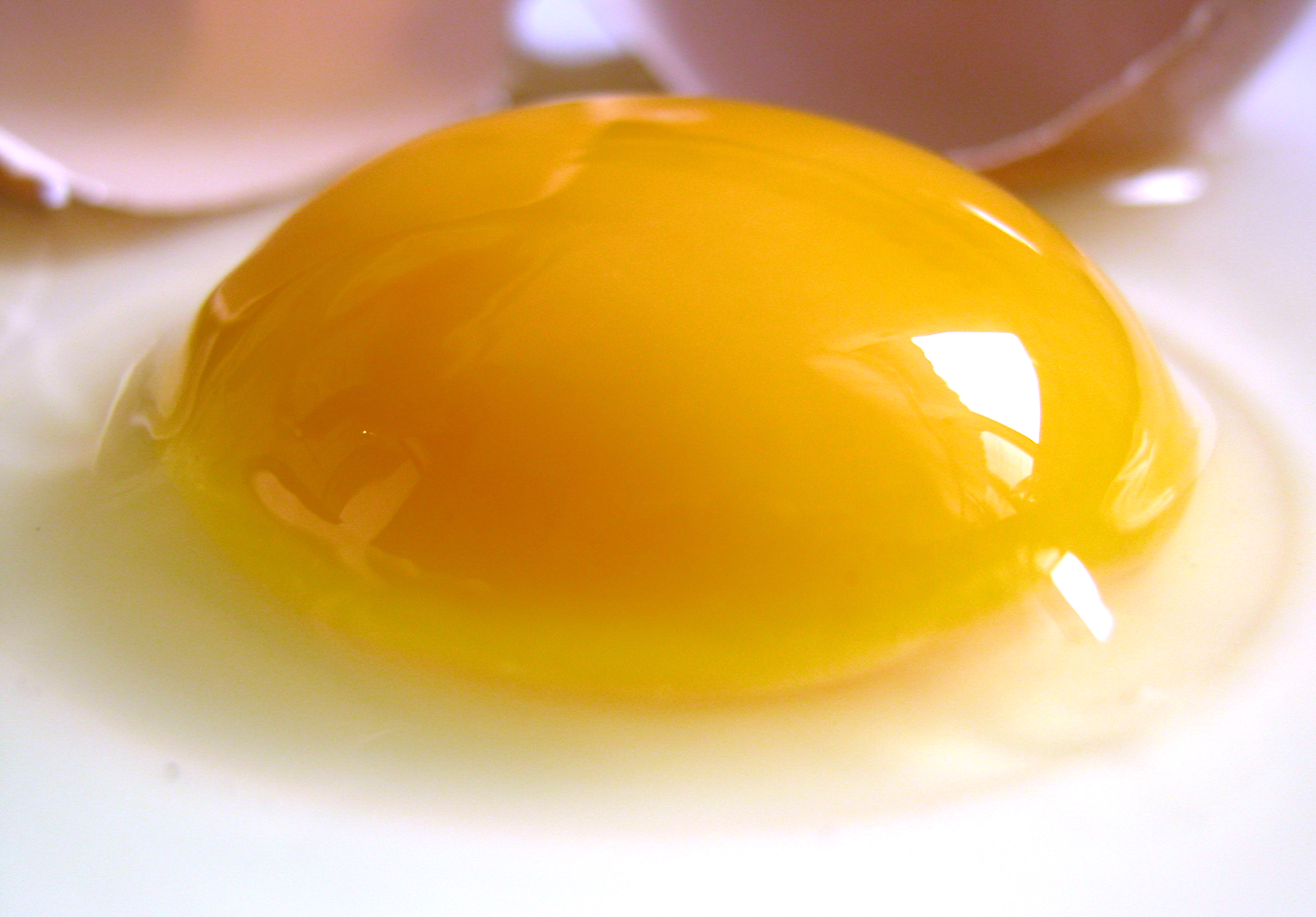
Chicken egg yolk with mikado yellow coloration

Mikado yellow is a shade of yellow. It is one of the colors of the national flags of Colombia and Myanmar. It was also once used for Lincoln automobiles, and is the name of various dyes and colorings.

== See also ==
- List of colors
