= Lemon chiffon =

Dessert

Lemon Chiffon
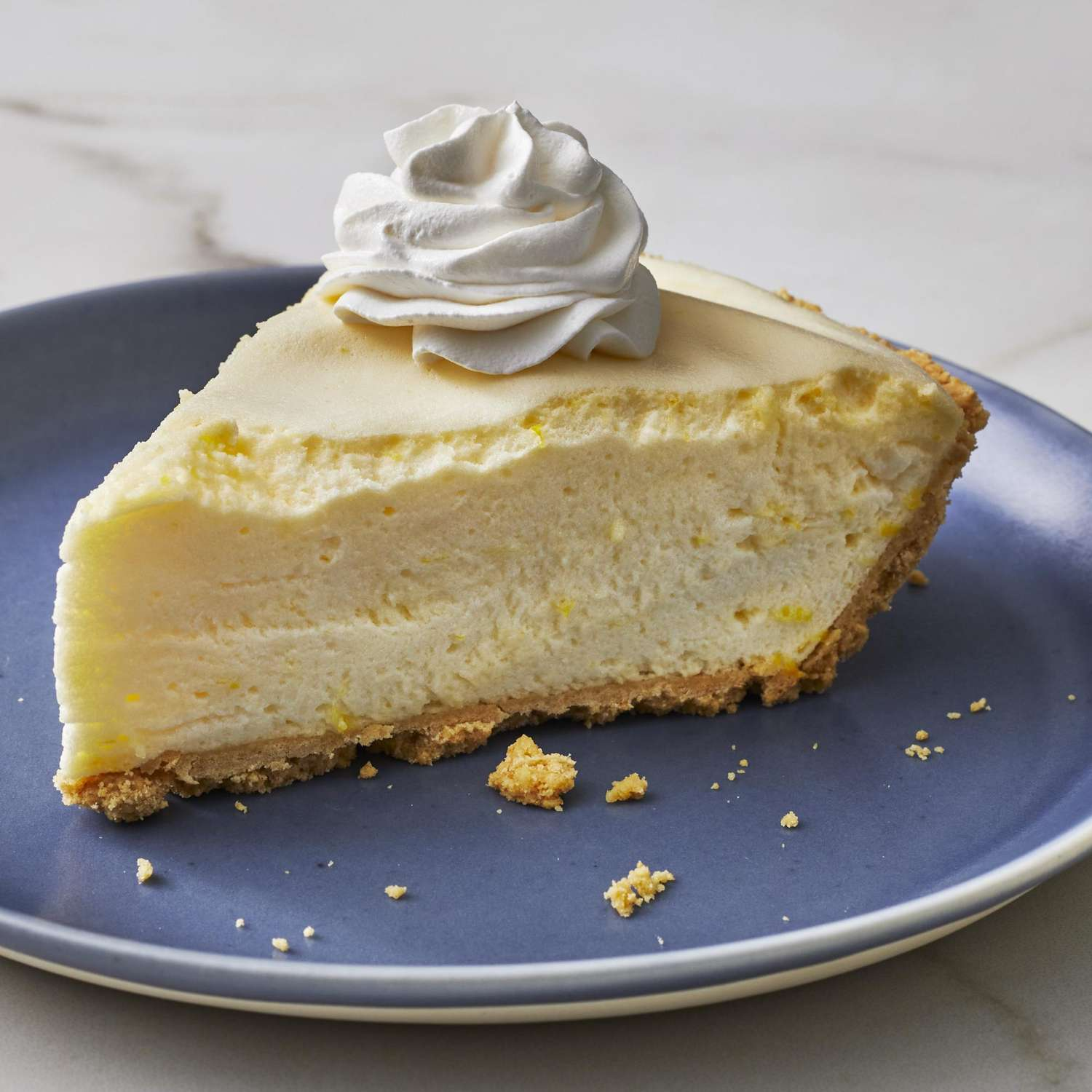
- Place of origin: United States
- Region or state: United States
- Created by: Harry Baker
- Invented: 1920s
- Food energy (per serving): 707 kcal (2,960 kJ)

Lemon chiffon or simply Chiffon cake is a light, airy dessert known for its delicate texture and lemon flavor. It is often considered one of the first "light cakes" due to its use of vegetable oil and the incorporation of whipped egg whites, which result in a moist consistency. The cake is often served with a lemon glaze or frosting.

== History ==
Lemon Chiffon cake was created in the early 1920s by Harry Baker, an insurance salesman and amateur baker from Los Angeles, California. After experimenting with newer recipes, Baker developed the cake after years of innovating his technique for creating lighter cakes. The unusual use of vegetable oil instead of butter and the incorporation of whipped egg whites allowed the cake to have an unusually light and airy texture that set it apart from other cakes of the time.

Baker initially kept the recipe to himself, baking the cake for family and friends. However, in 1948, the popularity of his creation led him to sell the rights to the recipe to General Mills, a major American food company. General Mills then began marketing the cake under the name "Chiffon Cake", and it quickly became a household favorite across the United States, particularly due to its lightness and fresh lemon flavor.

The cake was featured in numerous cookbooks and magazines, especially during the post-World War II era, when home baking became more popular. It was particularly favored for its easy-to-follow recipe and its ability to be served on various occasions, including family gatherings and formal events. Over time, Lemon chiffon cake became a classic, synonymous with spring and summer celebrations.

== Color ==
Lemon Chiffon

Color coordinates
- Hex triplet: #FFFACD
- sRGB^{B} (r, g, b): (255, 250, 205)
- HSV (h, s, v): (54°, 20%, 100%)
- CIELCh_{uv} (L, C, h): (98, 34, 81°)
- Source: X11
- ISCC–NBS descriptor: Pale greenish yellow
- B: Normalized to [0–255] (byte)

Lemon chiffon is the X11 color and web color It was formulated in 1987 when it was first introduced as a named color in the X Window System. After the invention of the World Wide Web in 1991, these colors became known as the X11 web colors.
