= Lists of colors =

The following are lists of colours;

- List of colours: A–F
- List of colours: G–M
- List of colours: N–Z
- List of colours (alphabetical)
- List of colours by shade
- List of colour palettes
- List of Crayola crayon colours
- List of RAL colours
- List of X11 colour names

== See also ==
- Index of colour-related articles
- List of dyes
- Web colours
