= List of Crayola crayon colors =

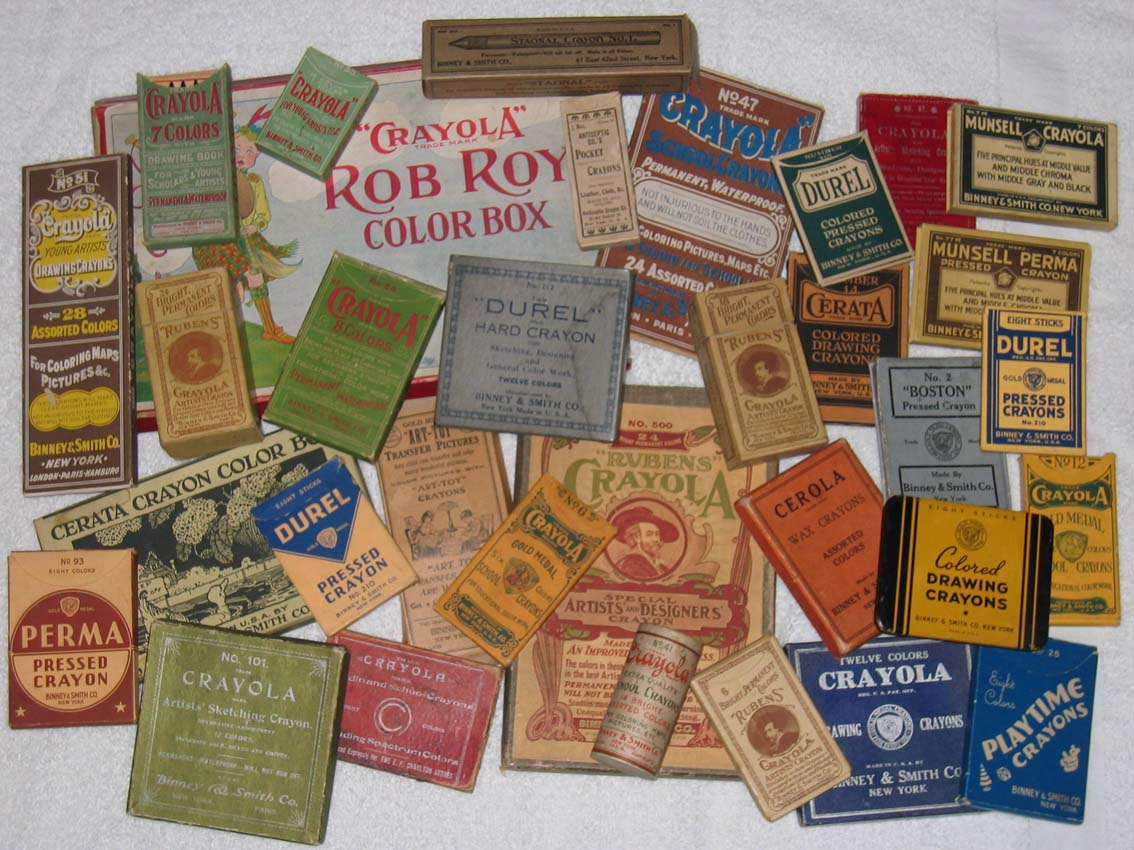
An assortment of crayon boxes produced by Binney & Smith between 1903 and 1920

Since the introduction of Crayola drawing crayons by Binney & Smith in 1903, more than 200 colors have been produced in a wide variety of assortments. The table below represents all of the colors found in regular Crayola assortments from 1903 to the present. (Note: Due to several factors, the values given should only be considered approximations. The apparent color of any crayon depends on the thickness with which the wax is laid down, the color and brightness of the surface being colored, and other considerations, such as the age and quality of individual crayons. In addition, crayons are produced using pigments, which are normally described using subtractive colors, with the primary colors of red, yellow, and blue; but electronic displays produce colors using the additive method, combining the primary colors of red, green, and blue.) Since the introduction of fluorescent crayons in the 1970s, the standard colors have been complemented by a number of specialty crayon assortments, represented in subsequent tables.

== Standard colors ==
Color	Name	Hexadecimal in their website depiction (Note: Unless otherwise indicated, the hex colors were found in the source code of the Crayola website. If unavailable, an approximate value is used.)	R	G	B	Years in production	Notes	8-Box	16-Box	24-Box	32-Box	48-Box	64-Box	96-Box	120-Box
	Red	#ED0A3F	238	32	77	1903–present		Yes	Yes	Yes	Yes	Yes	Yes	Yes	Yes
	Maroon	#C32148	195	33	72	1949–present	Known as "Dark Red", 1949–1958.	No	No	No	No	No	No	Yes	Yes
	Scarlet	#FD0E35	253	14	53	1998–present	Known as "Torch Red", 1998.	No	No	Yes	Yes	Yes	Yes	Yes	Yes
	Brick Red	#C62D42	198	45	66	1958–present		No	No	No	No	No	Yes	Yes	Yes
	English Vermilion	#CC474B	204	71	75	1903–1935	Also spelled "Vermillion".								
	Orange-Red	#EB3742	235	55	66	1958–1990, 1991, 1998, 2003, 2008, 2025	Re-released in 1991 in a limited edition 8-pack, in 1998 in a limited edition 40th anniversary 64-pack, in 2003 in a limited edition 12-pack, in 2008 in a limited edition 50th anniversary 64-pack, and in 2025 in a limited edition of the 8-pack, 32-pack, 64-pack, and 96-pack.								
	Mahogany	#CA3435	202	52	53	1949–present		No	No	No	No	Yes	Yes	Yes	Yes
	Madder Lake	#CC3336	204	51	54	1903–1935									
	Permanent Geranium Lake	#E12C2C	225	44	44	1903–circa 1910									
	Maximum Red	#D92121	217	33	33	1926–1944	Part of the Munsell line.								
	Chestnut	#B94E48	185	78	72	1903–present	Known as "Indian Red”, 1903-1999.	No	No	No	Yes	Yes	Yes	Yes	Yes
	Mango Tango	#FF3B29	255	59	41	2003–present	Replaced "Teal Blue" in 2003.	No	No	No	No	No	No	Yes	Yes
	Red-Orange	#FF3F34	255	63	52	1930–present		No	Yes	Yes	Yes	Yes	Yes	Yes	Yes
	Sunset Orange	#FE4C40	254	76	64	1997–present		No	No	No	No	No	No	No	Yes
	Bittersweet	#FE6F5E	254	111	94	1958–present		No	No	No	No	No	Yes	Yes	Yes
	Dark Venetian Red	#B33B24	179	59	36	1903–circa 1910	"Venetian Red, Dark" on labels.								
	Venetian Red	#CC553D	204	85	61	1903–1944									
	Light Venetian Red	#E6735C	230	115	92	1903–circa 1910	"Venetian Red, Light" on labels.								
	Vivid Tangerine	#FF9980	255	153	128	1990–present		No	No	No	No	No	No	Yes	Yes
	Middle Red	#E58E73	229	142	115	1926–1944	Part of the Munsell line.								
	Outrageous Orange	#FF6037	255	96	55	1972–present	Fluorescent color. Same color as "Ultra Orange" (1972–1990).	No	No	No	No	No	No	Yes	Yes
	Burnt Orange	#FF7034	255	112	52	1958–present		No	No	No	No	No	Yes	Yes	Yes
	Atomic Tangerine	#FF9966	255	153	102	1972–present	Fluorescent color. Same color as "Ultra Yellow" (1972–1990).	No	No	No	No	No	No	Yes	Yes
	Orange	#FF8833	255	136	51	1903–present		Yes	Yes	Yes	Yes	Yes	Yes	Yes	Yes
	Macaroni and Cheese	#FFB97B	255	185	123	1993–present	Also found as "Macaroni & Cheese" and "Macaroni-n-Cheese".	No	No	No	No	Yes	Yes	Yes	Yes
	Medium Orange	#ECAC76	236	172	118	1926–1944, 1949–1958	Part of the Munsell line, 1926–1944. Same color as "Middle Yellow Red" (1926–1949).								
	Neon Carrot	#FF9933	255	153	51	1990–present	Fluorescent color.	No	No	No	No	No	No	Yes	Yes
	Yellow-Orange	#FFAE42	255	174	66	1930–present		No	Yes	Yes	Yes	Yes	Yes	Yes	Yes
	Maximum Yellow Red	#F2BA49	242	186	73	1926–1944	Part of the Munsell line.								
	Banana Mania	#FBE7B2	251	231	178	1998–present		No	No	No	No	No	No	No	Yes
	Sunglow	#FFCC33	255	204	51	1990–present	Fluorescent color.	No	No	No	No	No	No	Yes	Yes
	Maize	#F2C649	242	198	73	1903–1990, 1991, 1998, 2003, 2008	Known as "Gold Ochre", 1903–1958. "Golden Ochre" on some labels. Re-released in 1991 in a limited edition 8-pack, in 1998 in a limited edition 40th anniversary 64-pack, 2003 in a limited edition 12-pack, and in 2008 in a limited edition 50th anniversary 64-pack.								
	Orange-Yellow	#F8D568	248	213	104	1958–1990, 1991, 1998, 2003, 2008	Re-released in 1991 in a limited edition 8-pack, in 1998 in a limited edition 40th anniversary 64-pack, 2003 in a limited edition 12-pack, and in 2008 in a limited edition 50th anniversary 64-pack.								
	Goldenrod	#FCD667	252	214	103	1903–present	Known as "Medium Chrome Yellow" (1903–?), "Medium Yellow" (1903–1958), and "Banana Bonanza" (2015–2018).	No	No	No	No	Yes	Yes	Yes	Yes
	Dandelion	#FED85D	254	216	93	1990–2017, 2025–present	Re-released in 2025 in a limited edition of the 8-pack, 32-pack, 64-pack, and 96-pack. Returned in 2026.	No	No	Yes	No	No	Yes	No	No
	Crayellow	#F1D651	241	214	81	2021–present*	The color was introduced for Colors of Kindness.	No*	No*	No*	No*	No*	No*	No*	No*
	Yellow	#FBE870	251	232	112	1903–present		Yes	Yes	Yes	Yes	Yes	Yes	Yes	Yes
	Unmellow Yellow	#FFEE66	255	238	102	1990–present	Fluorescent color.	No	No	No	No	No	No	Yes	Yes
	Green-Yellow	#F1E788	241	231	136	1958–present		No	No	Yes	Yes	Yes	Yes	Yes	Yes
	Middle Yellow	#FFEB00	255	235	0	1926–1944	Part of the Munsell line.								
	Lemon Yellow	#EFE75E	239	231	94	1903–1990, 1991, 1998, 2003, 2008, 2025	Also known as "Light Chrome Yellow" ("Chrome Yellow, Light" on labels) or "Light Yellow", 1903–1958. "Chrome Yellow, Light" on labels. Re-released in 1991 in a limited edition 8-pack, in 1998 in a limited edition 40th anniversary 64-pack, in 2003 in a limited edition 12-pack, in 2008 in a limited edition 50th anniversary 64-pack and in 2025 in a limited edition of the 8-pack, 32-pack, 64-pack, and 96-pack.								
	Olive Green	#B5B35C	181	179	92	1903–present		No	No	No	No	Yes	Yes	Yes	Yes
	Spring Green	#ECEBBD	236	235	189	1958–present		No	No	No	No	Yes	Yes	Yes	Yes
	Maximum Yellow	#FAFA37	250	250	55	1926–1944	Part of the Munsell line.								
	Canary	#FFFF99	255	255	153	1998–present		No	No	No	No	No	No	No	Yes
	Inchworm	#DEE327	222	227	39	2003–present	Known as "Inch Worm", 2003-2005. Replaced "Magic Mint" in 2003.	No	No	No	No	No	No	Yes	Yes
	Maximum Green Yellow	#D9E650	217	230	80	1926–1944	Part of the Munsell line.								
	Laser Lemon	#E6FF66	230	255	102	1972–present	Fluorescent color. Same color as "Chartreuse" (1972–1990).	No	No	No	No	No	No	Yes	Yes
	Electric Lime	#CCFF00	204	255	0	1990–present	Fluorescent color.	No	No	No	No	No	No	Yes	Yes
	Middle Green Yellow	#ACBF60	172	191	96	1926–1944	Part of the Munsell line.								
	Light Chrome Green	#BEE64B	190	230	75	1903–1935	"Chrome Green, Light" on labels. Same color as "Light Green" (1903–1935).								
	Yellow-Green	#C5E17A	197	225	122	1930–present		No	Yes	Yes	Yes	Yes	Yes	Yes	Yes
	Maximum Green	#5E8C31	94	140	49	1926–1944	Part of the Munsell line.								
	Asparagus	#7BA05B	123	160	91	1993–present		No	No	No	No	No	Yes	Yes	Yes
	Granny Smith Apple	#9DE093	157	224	147	1993–present		No	No	No	No	Yes	Yes	Yes	Yes
	Screamin' Green	#66FF66	102	255	102	1972–present	Fluorescent color. Same color as "Ultra Green" (1972–1990).	No	No	No	No	No	No	Yes	Yes
	Fern	#63B76C	99	183	108	1998–present		No	No	No	No	No	No	No	Yes
	Middle Green	#4D8C57	77	140	87	1926–1944	Part of the Munsell line.								
	Green	#01A368	1	163	104	1903–present		Yes	Yes	Yes	Yes	Yes	Yes	Yes	Yes
	Medium Chrome Green	#6CA67C	108	166	124	1903–1939	"Chrome Green, Medium" on labels. Same color as "Medium Green" (1903–1939).								
	Forest Green	#5FA777	95	167	119	1949–present	Known as "Dark Green", 1949–1958.	No	No	No	No	No	Yes	Yes	Yes
	Magic Mint	#83CAA2	131	202	162	1990–2003, 2025	Fluorescent color. Re-released in 2003 in a limited edition 12-pack and in 2025 in a limited edition of the 8-pack, 32-pack, 64-pack, and 96-pack.								
	Sea Green	#93DFB8	147	223	184	1949–present	Known as "Light Green", 1949–1958.	No	No	No	No	Yes	Yes	Yes	Yes
	Shamrock	#33CC99	51	204	153	1993–present		No	No	No	No	No	No	Yes	Yes
	Mountain Meadow	#1AB385	26	179	133	1998–present		No	No	No	No	No	No	No	Yes
	Jungle Green	#29AB87	41	171	135	1990–present		No	No	No	No	No	No	Yes	Yes
	Caribbean Green	#00CC99	0	204	153	1997–present		No	No	No	No	No	No	No	Yes
	Tropical Rain Forest	#00755E	0	117	94	1993–present		No	No	No	No	No	No	Yes	Yes
	Middle Blue Green	#8DD9CC	141	217	204	1926–1944	Part of the Munsell line.								
	Pine Green	#01796F	1	121	111	1903–1949, 1958–present	Known as "Dark Chrome Green" ("Chrome Green, Dark" on labels) or "Dark Green", 1903–1949.	No	No	No	No	No	No	Yes	Yes
	Maximum Blue Green	#30BFBF	48	191	191	1926–1944	Part of the Munsell line.								
	Cool Mint	#DDEBEC	221	235	236	2021–present*	The color was introduced for Colors of Kindness.	No*	No*	No*	No*	No*	No*	No*	No*
	Robin's Egg Blue	#00CCCC	0	204	204	1993–present		No	No	No	No	No	Yes	Yes	Yes
	Teal Blue	#008080	0	128	128	1990–2003	Re-released in 2003 in a limited edition 12-pack.								
	Light Blue	#8FD8D8	143	216	216	1958									
	Aquamarine	#95E0E8	149	224	232	1949–present	Known as "Light Turquoise Blue", 1949–1958.	No	No	No	No	No	No	No	Yes
	Turquoise Blue	#6CDAE7	108	218	231	1935–present	Available only in bulk, 1935–1949.	No	No	No	No	No	Yes	Yes	Yes
	Outer Space	#2D383A	45	56	58	1998–present		No	No	No	No	No	No	No	Yes
	Sky Blue	#76D7EA	118	215	234	1958–present		No	No	No	Yes	Yes	Yes	Yes	Yes
	Middle Blue	#7ED4E6	126	212	230	1926–1944	Part of the Munsell line.								
	Blizzard Blue	#64CAE0	100	202	224	1972–2003, 2025	Fluorescent color. Known as "Ultra Blue" (1972–1990). Re-released in 2003 in a limited edition 12-pack and in 2025 in a limited edition of the 8-pack, 32-pack, 64-pack, and 96-pack.								
	Blue-Green	#0095B7	0	149	183	1949–present	Known as "Middle Blue-Green", 1949–1958.	No	Yes	Yes	Yes	Yes	Yes	Yes	Yes
	Pacific Blue	#009DC4	0	157	196	1993–present		No	No	No	No	No	Yes	Yes	Yes
	Cerulean	#02A4D3	2	164	211	1990–present		No	No	Yes	Yes	Yes	Yes	Yes	Yes
	Maximum Blue	#47ABCC	71	171	204	1926–1958	Part of the Munsell line, 1926–1944. Also known as "Blue-Green", 1930–1958.								
	Azure Blue	#2EB4E6	46	180	230	1903–1958	Known as "Blue", 1903-1935, and "Celestial Blue", 1935–1949.								
	Cerulean Blue	#339ACC	51	154	204	1949–1958									
	Cornflower	#93CCEA	147	204	234	1958–present		No	No	No	No	Yes	Yes	Yes	Yes
	Green-Blue	#2887C8	40	135	200	1958–1990, 1991, 1998, 2003, 2008	Re-released in 1991 in a limited edition 8-pack, in 1998 in a limited edition 40th anniversary 64-pack, in 2003 in a limited edition 12-pack, and in 2008 in a limited edition 50th anniversary 64-pack.								
	Midnight Blue	#003366	0	51	102	1903–present	Known as "Prussian Blue", 1903–1958.	No	No	No	No	No	No	Yes	Yes
	Navy Blue	#0066CC	0	102	204	1958–present		No	No	No	No	No	No	Yes	Yes
	Denim	#1560BD	21	96	189	1993–present		No	No	No	No	No	No	Yes	Yes
	Blue	#0066FF	0	102	255	1949–present		Yes	Yes	Yes	Yes	Yes	Yes	Yes	Yes
	Blue Ribbon	#0B10A2	0	102	204	1996	Crayola celebrated the creation of their 100 billionth crayon by publishing this crayon. It was only present in certain crayon 96-packs.								
	Blue Bell	#8CADDA	153	153	204	1998–present		No	No	No	No	No	No	No	Yes
	Powder Blue	#C0D5F0	192	213	240	2021–present*	The color was introduced for Colors of Kindness.	No*	No*	No*	No*	No*	No*	No*	No*
	Cadet Blue	#A9B2C3	169	178	195	1958–present		No	No	No	Yes	Yes	Yes	Yes	Yes
	Violet-Blue	#274BA1	39	75	161	1903–circa 1910, 1930–1990, 1991, 1998, 2003, 2008, 2025	Known as "Blue-Violet", 1930–1958. Re-released in 1991 in a limited edition 8-pack, in 1998 in a limited edition 40th anniversary 64-pack, in 2003 in a limited edition 12-pack, in 2008 in a limited edition 50th anniversary 64-pack, and in 2025 in a limited edition of the 8-pack, 32-pack, 64-pack, and 96-pack.								
	Periwinkle	#C3CDE6	195	205	230	1958–present		No	No	No	No	No	Yes	Yes	Yes
	Medium Blue	#4570E6	69	112	230	1935–1958	Known as "Blue", 1935–1949.								
	Bluetiful	#263A79	60	105	231	2017–present*	Replaced "Dandelion" in 2017.	No	No	No	Yes	Yes	Yes	Yes	Yes
	Indigo	#4F69C6	79	105	198	1999–present		No	No	Yes	Yes	Yes	No	Yes	Yes
	Manatee	#8D90A1	141	144	161	1998–present		No	No	No	No	No	No	No	Yes
	Wild Blue Yonder	#7A89B8	122	137	184	2003–present	Replaced "Blizzard Blue" in 2003.	No	No	No	No	No	No	Yes	Yes
	Cobalt Blue	#8C90C8	140	144	200	1903–1958									
	Celestial Blue	#7070CC	112	112	204	1903–circa 1910									
	Maximum Blue Purple	#ACACE6	172	172	230	1926–1944	Part of the Munsell line.								
	Blue-Violet	#6456B7	100	86	183	1949–present	Known as "Violet" 1949–1958.	No	Yes	Yes	Yes	Yes	Yes	Yes	Yes
	Ultramarine Blue	#3F26BF	63	38	191	1903–1944									
	Purple Mountains' Majesty	#8071B4	128	113	180	1993–present	Also found as "Purple Mountain Majesty" and "Purple Mountain's Majesty."	No	No	No	No	Yes	Yes	Yes	Yes
	Middle Blue Purple	#8B72BE	139	114	190	1926–1944	Part of the Munsell line.								
	Purple Heart	#652DC1	101	45	193	1998–present		No	No	No	No	No	No	No	Yes
	Royal Purple	#6B3FA0	107	63	160	1990–present		No	No	No	No	No	No	Yes	Yes
	Violet (II)	#8359A3	131	89	163	1930–1949, 1958–present	"Violet (Purple)" on labels.	Yes	Yes	Yes	Yes	Yes	Yes	Yes	Yes
	Medium Violet	#8F47B3	143	71	179	1949–1958									
	Wisteria	#C9A0DC	201	160	220	1993–present		No	No	No	Yes	Yes	Yes	Yes	Yes
	Lavender (I)	#BF8FCC	191	143	204	1949–1958									
	Vivid Violet	#803790	128	55	144	1997–present		No	No	No	No	No	No	No	Yes
	Maximum Purple	#733380	115	51	128	1926–1944	Part of the Munsell line.								
	Fuchsia	#C154C1	193	84	193	1990–present		No	No	No	No	No	No	Yes	Yes
	Thistle	#D8BFD8	216	191	216	1949–1999, 2008	Known as "Light Magenta", 1949–1958. The only color discontinued after 1990 to not be considered "officially retired". Re-released in 2008 in a limited edition 50th anniversary 64-pack.								
	Pink Flamingo	#FC74FD	253	116	253	1997–present		No	No	No	No	No	No	No	Yes
	Shocking Pink	#FF6EFF	255	110	255	1972–present	Fluorescent color. Same color as "Ultra Pink" (1972–1990).	No	No	No	No	No	No	Yes	Yes
	Violet (I)	#732E6C	115	46	108	1903–1930	Also known as "Purple" (1903–circa 1914).								
	Razzle Dazzle Rose	#EE34D2	238	52	210	1972–present	Fluorescent color. Same color as "Hot Magenta" (1972–1990).	No	No	No	No	No	No	Yes	Yes
	Brilliant Rose	#E667CE	230	103	206	1949–1958									
	Hot Magenta	#FF00CC (Note: Crayola's digital swatch has the same values as those of Purple Pizzazz.)	255	0	204	1990–present	Fluorescent color.	No	No	No	No	No	No	Yes	Yes
	Orchid	#E29CD2	226	156	210	1949–present	Known as "Medium Red-Violet", 1949–1958.	No	No	No	No	No	Yes	Yes	Yes
	Plum	#843179	132	49	121	1958–present		No	No	No	No	No	Yes	Yes	Yes
	Medium Rose	#D96CBE	217	108	190	1949–1958									
	Purple Pizzazz	#FF00BB (Note: Crayola's digital swatch has the same values as those of Hot Magenta (1990–present).)	255	0	187	1990–present	Fluorescent color.	No	No	No	No	No	No	Yes	Yes
	Red-Violet	#BB3385	187	51	133	1930–present		No	Yes	Yes	Yes	Yes	Yes	Yes	Yes
	Middle Purple	#D982B5	217	130	181	1926–1944	Part of the Munsell line.								
	Maximum Red Purple	#A63A79	166	58	121	1926–1944	Part of the Munsell line.								
	Jazzberry Jam	#A50B5E	165	11	94	2003–present	Replaced "Mulberry" in 2003.	No	No	No	No	No	No	Yes	Yes
	Eggplant	#614051	97	64	81	1998–present		No	No	No	No	No	No	No	Yes
	Mulberry	#AF1F65	175	31	101	1958–2003, 2008, 2025	Re-released in 2003 in a limited edition 12-pack, in 2008 in a limited edition 50th anniversary 64-pack, and in 2025 in a limited edition of the 8-pack, 32-pack, 64-pack, and 96-pack.								
	Magenta	#F653A6	246	83	166	1903–present	Same color as "Permanent Magenta" (1903–?).	No	No	No	No	No	Yes	Yes	Yes
	Cerise	#DA3287	218	50	135	1993–present		No	No	No	No	No	No	Yes	Yes
	Wild Strawberry	#FF3399	255	51	153	1990–present		No	No	No	No	No	Yes	Yes	Yes
	Lavender (III)	#FBAED2	251	174	210	1999–present	Same color as "Thistle".	No	No	No	No	Yes	Yes	Yes	Yes
	Cotton Candy	#FFB7D5	255	183	213	1998–present		No	No	No	No	No	No	No	Yes
	Carnation Pink	#FFA6C9	255	166	201	1903–present	Known as "Rose Pink" (1903–1958) and "Pink" (1903–1917).	No	Yes	Yes	Yes	Yes	Yes	Yes	Yes
	Violet-Red	#F7468A	247	70	138	1958–present		No	No	Yes	Yes	Yes	Yes	Yes	Yes
	Razzmatazz	#E30B5C	227	11	92	1993–present		No	No	No	No	No	No	Yes	Yes
	Lavender (II)	#FFF0F5	255	240	245	1958–1999									
	Piggy Pink	#FDD7E4	253	215	228	1998–present	Originally called "Pig Pink."	No	No	No	No	No	No	No	Yes
	Carmine	#E62E6B	230	46	107	1935–1958	Known as "Carmine Red", 1949–1958.								
	Blush	#DB5079	219	80	121	1998–present	Known as "Cranberry", 1998–2005.	No	No	No	No	No	No	No	Yes
	Tickle Me Pink	#FC80A5	252	128	165	1993–present		No	No	No	No	No	Yes	Yes	Yes
	Mauvelous	#F091A9	240	145	169	1993–present		No	No	No	No	Yes	Yes	Yes	Yes
	Pink Sherbert	#F78FA7	247	163	142	1998–present	Known as "Brink Pink", 1998–2005.	No	No	No	No	No	No	No	Yes
	Salmon	#FF91A4	255	145	164	1949–present		No	No	No	No	Yes	Yes	Yes	Yes
	Radical Red	#FF355E	255	53	94	1990–present	Fluorescent color.	No	No	No	No	No	No	Yes	Yes
	Wild Watermelon	#FD5B78	253	91	120	1972–present	Fluorescent color. Same color as "Ultra Red" (1972–1990).	No	No	No	No	No	No	Yes	Yes
	Middle Red Purple	#A55353	165	83	83	1926–1944	Part of the Munsell line.								
	Fuzzy Wuzzy	#C7625A	135	66	31	1998–present	Known as "Fuzzy Wuzzy Brown", 1998–2005.	No	No	No	No	No	No	No	Yes
	Melon	#FEBAAD	254	186	173	1958–present	Also known as Light Red.	No	No	No	Yes	Yes	Yes	Yes	Yes
	Burnt Sienna	#E97451	233	116	81	1903–present	Was to be retired in 2003, alongside four other colors, but was saved in a campaign known as "Save the Shade"	No	No	No	No	Yes	Yes	Yes	Yes
	Brown	#AF593E	175	89	62	1903–present		Yes	Yes	Yes	Yes	Yes	Yes	Yes	Yes
	Sepia	#9E5B40	158	91	64	1935–1944, 1958–present	Available only in bulk, 1935–1939.	No	No	No	No	Yes	Yes	Yes	Yes
	Beaver	#926F5B	146	111	91	1998–present		No	No	No	No	No	No	No	Yes
	Raw Sienna	#D27D46	210	125	70	1958–present		No	No	No	No	Yes	Yes	Yes	Yes
	Tumbleweed	#DEA681	222	166	129	1993–present		No	No	No	No	Yes	Yes	Yes	Yes
	Van Dyke Brown	#664228	102	66	40	1903–circa 1910	Same color as "Brown" (1903–1910).								
	Tan	#FA9D5A	250	157	90	1958–present		No	No	No	Yes	Yes	Yes	Yes	Yes
	Desert Sand	#EDC9AF	237	201	175	1998–present		No	No	No	No	No	No	No	Yes
	Peach	#FFCBA4	255	203	164	1903–present	Known as "Flesh Tint" (1903–1949), "Flesh" (1949–1956, 1958–1962), and "Pink Beige" (1956–1958).	No	No	No	Yes	Yes	Yes	Yes	Yes
	Burnt Umber	#805533	128	85	51	1903–1944									
	Apricot	#FDD5B1	253	213	177	1958–present		No	No	Yes	Yes	Yes	Yes	Yes	Yes
	Raw Umber	#886A4E	136	106	78	1903–1990, 1991, 1998, 2003, 2008, 2025	Re-released in 1991 in a limited edition 8-pack, in 1998 in a limited edition 40th anniversary 64-pack, in 2003 in a limited edition 12-pack, in 2008 in a limited edition 50th anniversary 64-pack, and in 2025 in a limited edition of the 8-pack, 32-pack, 64-pack, and 96-pack.								
	Almond	#EED9C4	238	217	196	1998–present		No	No	No	No	No	No	No	Yes
	Shadow	#837050	131	112	80	1998–present		No	No	No	No	No	No	No	Yes
	Raw Sienna (I)	#E6BC5C	230	188	92	1903–circa 1910									
	Gold (I)	#92926E	146	146	110	1903–1944	Metallic; swatch represents nominal hue only. Available only in bulk after 1915.								
	Gold (II)	#E6BE8A	230	190	138	1953–present	Metallic; swatch represents nominal hue only. Available only in bulk, 1953–1956.	No	No	No	No	No	Yes	Yes	Yes
	Silver	#C9C0BB	201	192	187	1903–present	Metallic; swatch represents nominal hue only. Available only in bulk, 1915–1944.	No	No	No	No	No	Yes	Yes	Yes
	Copper	#DA8A67	218	138	103	1903–1915, 1958–present	Metallic; swatch represents nominal hue only.	No	No	No	No	No	No	Yes	Yes
	Antique Brass	#C88A65	200	138	101	1998–present	Metallic; swatch represents nominal hue only.	No	No	No	No	No	No	No	Yes
	Black	#000000	0	0	0	1903–present		Yes	Yes	Yes	Yes	Yes	Yes	Yes	Yes
	Charcoal Gray	#736A62	115	106	98	1903–circa 1910									
	Gray	#8B8680	139	134	128	1926–present	As "Middle Grey", part of the Munsell line, 1926–1944. Spelled "Grey" on labels, but "Gray" on boxes. Also called "Neutral Grey", 1930–1956.	No	No	Yes	Yes	Yes	Yes	Yes	Yes
	Blue-Gray	#C8C8CD	200	200	205	1958–1990, 1991, 1998, 2003, 2008	Re-released in 1991 in a limited edition 8- pack, in 1998 in a limited edition 40th anniversary 64-pack, in 2003 in a limited edition 12-pack, and in 2008 in a limited edition 50th anniversary 64-pack.								
	Timberwolf	#D9D6CF	217	214	207	1993–present		No	No	No	Yes	Yes	Yes	Yes	Yes
	Oatmeal	#D9DAD2	217	218	210	2021–present*	The color was introduced for Colors of Kindness.	No*	No*	No*	No*	No*	No*	No*	No*
	White	#FFFFFF	255	255	255	1903–present		No	Yes	Yes	Yes	Yes	Yes	Yes	Yes

== Specialty crayons ==
Along with the regular packs of crayons, there have been many specialty sets, including Silver Swirls, Gem Tones, Pearl Brite Crayons, Metallic FX Crayons, Magic Scent Crayons, Silly Scents, and more.

=== Fluorescent crayons ===
In 1972, Binney & Smith introduced eight Crayola fluorescent crayons, designed to fluoresce under black light. The following year, they were added to the 72-count box, which had previously contained two of the eight most-used colors, in place of the duplicate crayons. These crayons remained steady until 1990, when all eight were renamed, and eight more were added, for a total of 16 fluorescent crayons. One of the new colors, Hot Magenta, shared a name with one of the original colors, now Razzle Dazzle Rose. For some reason, two of the original eight fluorescent crayons have the same color as two of the newer crayons. In 1992, the fluorescent colors were added to the new No. 96 box, becoming part of the standard lineup. When four new crayons were added to the No. 96 assortment in 2003, four existing colors were discontinued, including two of the fluorescents. Also beginning in 1993, packs of fluorescent crayons were regularly labeled "neon" or "neons".

Color	Name	Hexadecimal	R	G	B	Notes
	Radical Red	#FF355E	255	53	94	Introduced in 1990.
	Wild Watermelon	#FD5B78	253	91	120	Same color as "Ultra Red" (1972–1990).
	Outrageous Orange	#FF6037	255	96	55	Same color as "Ultra Orange" (1972–1990).
	Atomic Tangerine	#FF9966	255	153	102	Same color as "Ultra Yellow" (1972–1990).
	Neon Carrot	#FF9933	255	153	51	Introduced in 1990.
	Sunglow	#FFCC33	255	204	51	Introduced in 1990.
	Unmellow Yellow	#FFEE66	255	238	102	Introduced in 1990.
	Laser Lemon	#E6FF66	230	255	102	Same color as "Chartreuse" (1972–1990).
	Electric Lime	#CCFF00	204	255	0	Introduced in 1990.
	Screamin' Green	#66FF66	102	255	102	Same color as "Ultra Green" (1972–1990).
	Magic Mint	#83CAA2	131	202	162	Produced 1990–2003. Re-released in 2003 in a limited edition 12-pack and in 2025 in a limited edition of the 8-pack, 32-pack, 64-pack, and 96-pack.
	Blizzard Blue	#64CAE0	100	202	224	Same color as "Ultra Blue" (1972–1990). Re-released in 2003 in a limited edition 12-pack and in 2025 in a limited edition of the 8-pack, 32-pack, 64-pack, and 96-pack.
	Shocking Pink	#FF6EFF	255	110	255	Same color as "Ultra Pink" (1972–1990).
	Razzle Dazzle Rose	#EE34D2	238	52	210	Same color as "Hot Magenta" (1972–1990).
	Hot Magenta	#FF00CC (Note: Crayola's digital swatch has the same values as those of Purple Pizzazz.)	255	0	204	Introduced in 1990.
	Purple Pizzazz	#FF00BB (Note: Crayola's digital swatch has the same values as those of Hot Magenta (1990–present).)	255	0	187	Introduced in 1990.

=== Fabric Crayons ===
In 1976, Crayola released a pack of eight Fabric Crayons. Each crayon was named after a standard color. In 1980, "Light Blue" was discontinued and replaced with Black. In 1981, "Magenta" was renamed to "Red". The colors' hexadecimal values are currently unknown. The names of the colors are listed below:

Color	Name	Notes
	Black	Introduced in 1980
	Blue	
	Light Blue	Discontinued in 1980
	Green	
	Yellow	
	Burnt Sienna	
	Orange	
	Red	Formerly "Magenta" until 1981
	Violet	"Purple" on labels (1976-c. 1978)

=== Metallic Crayons (Canada) ===
In 1987, Crayola released a pack of 16 Metallic Crayons in Canada. Four of the colors are named after four of the standard colors. Also, one of the colors is named before a Metallic FX color. The colors' hexadecimal values are currently unknown. The names of the colors are listed below:

- Aged Copper
- Aztec Gold
- Bluetonium
- Brass
- Bronze
- Cadmium Red
- Cast Iron
  - Leather Iron
    - Khaki Quest Iron
  - Umlimited Cast Iron
  - Powder Cast Iron
- Cobalt Blue
- Copper
- Gold
- Kryptonite
- Rust
- Silver
- Steel Blue
- Tarnished Gold
- Titanium

=== Silver Swirls ===
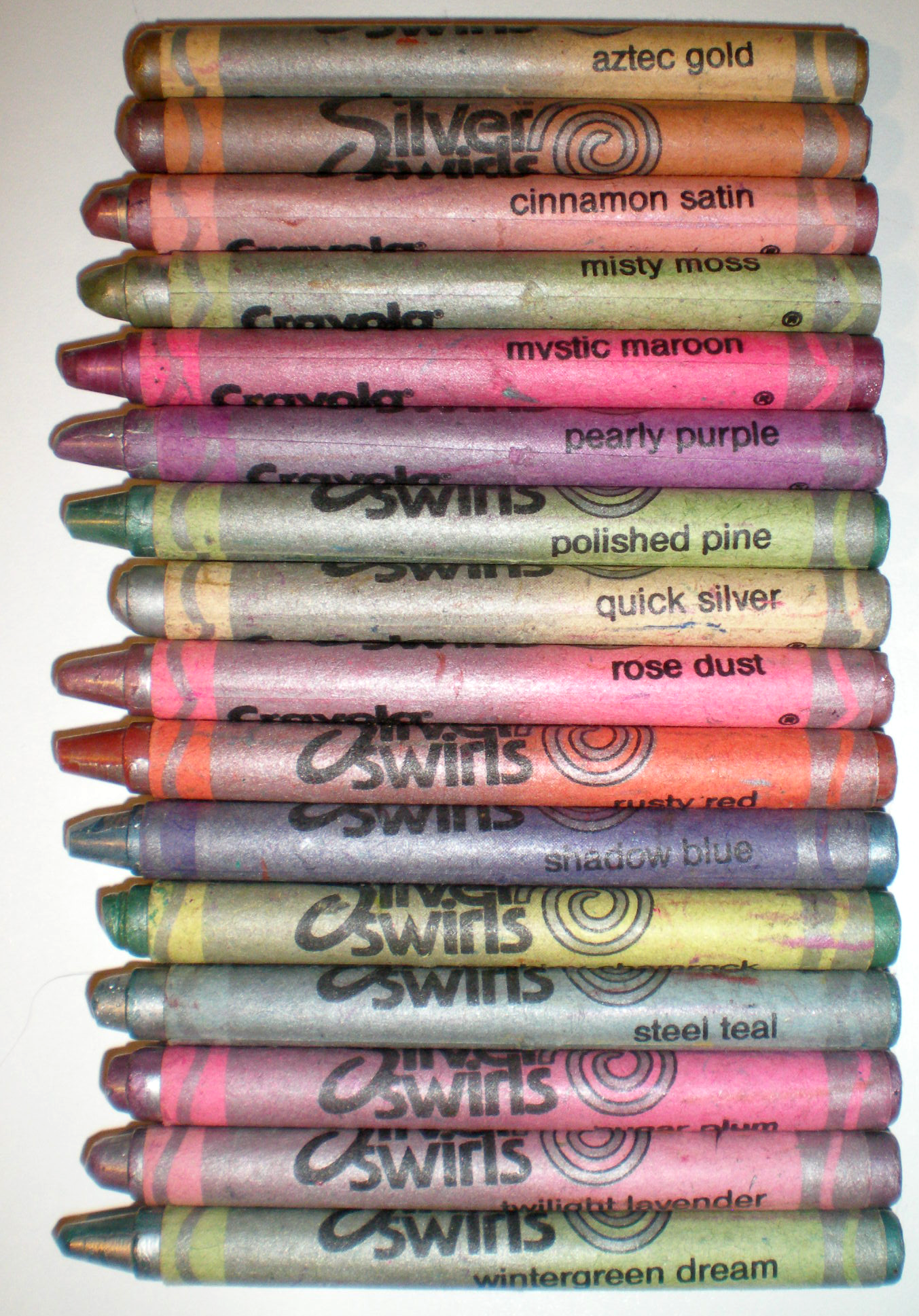
16 of the 24 Silver Swirls colors

In 1990, Crayola released Silver Swirls, a pack of 24 silvery colors. The colors' hexadecimal values are approximated below.

Color	Name	Hexadecimal	R	G	B
	Rusty Red	#DA2C43	218	44	67
	Copper Penny	#AD6F69	173	111	105
	Burnished Brown	#A17A74	161	122	116
	Aztec Gold	#C39953	195	153	83
	Misty Moss	#BBB477	187	180	119
	Shiny Shamrock	#5FA778	95	167	120
	Polished Pine	#5DA493	93	164	147
	Wintergreen Dream	#56887D	86	136	125
	Green Sheen	#6EAEA1	110	174	161
	Steel Teal	#5F8A8B	95	138	139
	Pewter Blue	#8BA8B7	139	168	183
	Cerulean Frost	#6D9BC3	109	155	195
	Shadow Blue	#778BA5	119	139	165
	Cosmic Cobalt	#2E2D88	46	45	136
	Glossy Grape	#AB92B3	171	146	179
	Lilac Luster	#AE98AA	174	152	170
	Pearly Purple	#B768A2	183	104	162
	Sugar Plum	#914E75	145	78	117
	Mystic Maroon	#AD4379	173	67	121
	Twilight Lavender	#8A496B	138	73	107
	Cinnamon Satin	#CD607E	205	96	126
	Rose Dust	#9E5E6F	158	94	111
	Quick Silver	#A6A6A6	166	166	166
	Granite Gray	#676767	103	103	103

=== Multicultural Crayons ===
In 1992, Crayola released a set of eight Multicultural Crayons which "come in an assortment of skin hues that give a child a realistic palette for coloring their world." The eight colors used came from their standard list of colors (none of these colors are exclusive to this set), and the set was, for the most part, well received, though there has also been some criticism.

Color	Name	Hexadecimal	R	G	B	Notes
	White	#FFFFFF	255	255	255	Produced 1903–present.
	Apricot	#FDD5B1	253	213	177	Produced 1958–present.
	Peach	#FFCBA4	255	203	164	Produced 1903–present. Known as "Flesh Tint" (1903–1949), "Flesh" (1949–1956, 1958–1962), and "Pink Beige" (1956–1958).
	Tan	#FA9D5A	250,	157	90	Produced 1958–present.
	Burnt Sienna	#E97451	233	116	81	Produced 1903–present.
	Sepia	#9E5B40	158	91	64	Produced 1935–1944, 1958–present. Available only in bulk, 1935–1949.
	Mahogany	#CA3435	202	52	53	Produced 1949–present.
	Black	#000000	0	0	0	Produced 1903–present.

=== Magic Scent Crayons ===
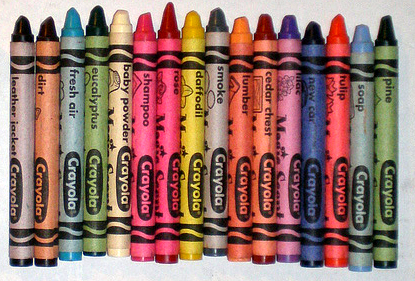
16 of the 30 Crayola Magic Scent Crayons (showing Leather Jacket, Dirt, Fresh Air, Eucalyptus, Baby Powder, Shampoo, Rose, Daffodil, Smoke, Lumber, Cedar Chest, Lilac, New Car, Tulip, Soap, and Pine)

In 1994, Crayola produced a 16-pack of crayons that released fragrances when used. In 1995, Crayola changed some of the scents because of complaints received from parents that some of the crayons smelled good enough to eat, like the Cherry, Chocolate, and Blueberry scented crayons. Crayons with food scents were retired in favor of non-food scents. The 30 crayons all consisted of regular Crayola colors.

Color	Name of Scent	Name of Crayola Color Used	Hexadecimal	R	G	B
	Rose	Red	#ED0A3F	237	10	63
	Cedar Chest	Mahogany	#CA3435	202	52	53
	Chocolate	Brown	#AF593E	175	89	62
	Dirt	Sepia	#9E5B40	158	91	64
	Jelly Bean	Orange	#FF8833	255	136	51
	Orange	Orange	#FF8833	255	136	51
	Tulip	Orange	#FF8833	255	136	51
	Peach	Peach	#FFCBA4	255	203	164
	Lumber	Apricot	#FDD5B1	253	213	177
	Banana	Dandelion	#FED85D	254	216	93
	Lemon	Yellow	#FBE870	251	232	112
	Daffodil	Yellow	#FBE870	251	232	112
	Lime	Yellow Green	#C5E17A	197	225	122
	Eucalyptus	Jungle Green	#29AB87	41	171	135
	Pine	Pine Green	#01796F	1	121	111
	Fresh Air	Sky Blue	#76D7EA	118	215	234
	New Car	Blue (III)	#0066FF	0	102	255
	Soap	Periwinkle	#C3CDE6	195	205	230
	Blueberry	Blue (II)	#4570E6	69	112	230
	Grape	Violet	#8359A3	131	89	163
	Lilac	Wisteria	#C9A0DC	201	160	220
	Strawberry	Wild Strawberry	#FF3399	255	51	153
	Shampoo	Carnation Pink	#FFA6C9	255	166	201
	Bubble Gum	Tickle Me Pink	#FC80A5	252	128	165
	Cherry	Maroon	#C32148	195	33	72
	Coconut	White	#FFFFFF	255	255	255
	Baby Powder	White	#FFFFFF	255	255	255
	Smoke	Gray	#8B8680	139	134	128
	Licorice	Black	#000000	0	0	0
	Leather Jacket	Black	#000000	0	0	0

=== Gem Tones ===
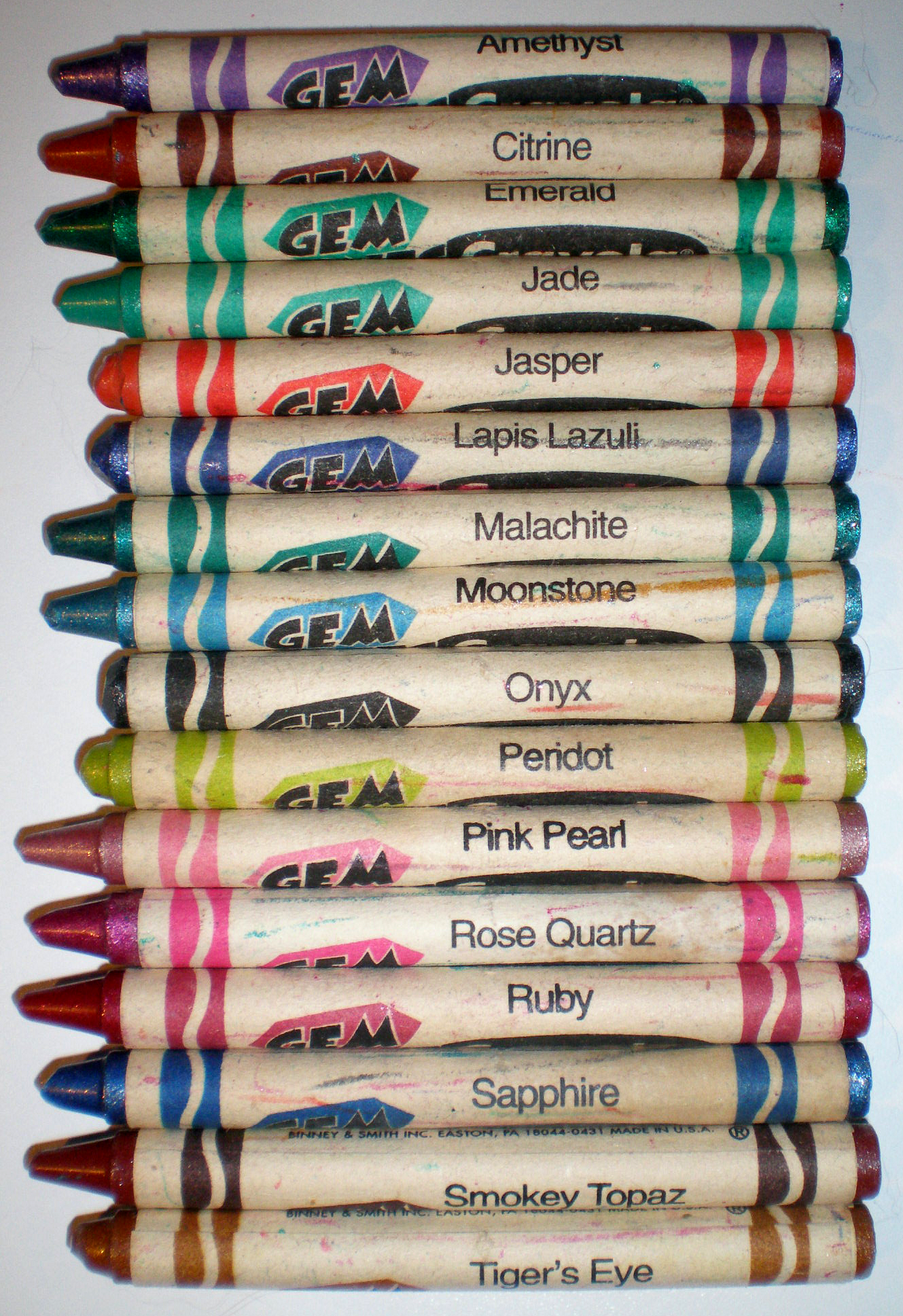
All 16 Crayola Gem Tones crayon colors

In 1994, Crayola released Gem Tones, a pack of 16 crayons modeled after the colors of gemstones. The colors' hexadecimal values are approximated below:

Color	Name	Hexadecimal	R	G	B
	Jasper	#D05340	208	83	64
	Smokey Topaz	#832A0D	131	42	13
	Citrine	#933709	147	55	9
	Tiger's Eye	#B56917	181	105	23
	Peridot	#ABAD48	171	173	72
	Jade	#469A84	70	154	132
	Emerald	#14A989	20	169	137
	Malachite	#469496	70	148	150
	Moonstone	#3AA8C1	58	168	193
	Sapphire	#2D5DA1	45	93	161
	Lapis Lazuli	#436CB9	67	108	185
	Amethyst	#64609A	100	96	154
	Rose Quartz	#BD559C	189	85	156
	Ruby	#AA4069	170	64	105
	Pink Pearl	#B07080	176	112	128
	Onyx	#353839	53	56	57

=== Glow in the Dark Crayons ===
In 1994, Crayola released Glow in the Dark Crayons, a pack of eight crayons. However, it did not contain any color names in North America. Only four of the colors were available in the U.K.

=== Crayola Changeables ===
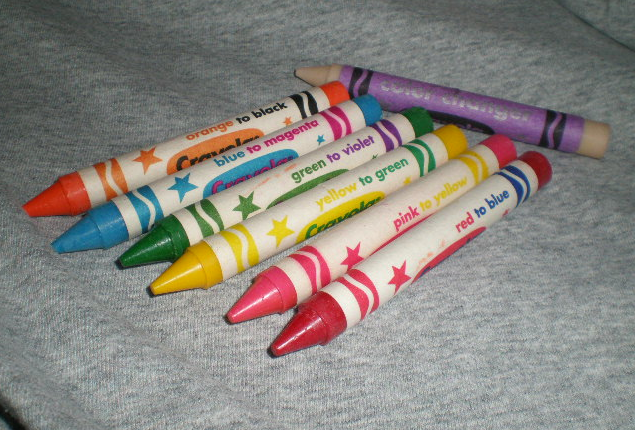
All six Crayola Changeables crayons with color changer

The Crayola Changeables crayons were introduced in 1995. The chart includes the color changer, an off-white crayon that goes on clear and initiates the color changes in the other crayons from the "From color" to the "To color".

From color	Name	Hexadecimal	To color	Name	Hexadecimal	R	G	B
	Blue	#C0E7F1		Magenta	#EB58DD	235	88	221
	Green	#91E351		Violet	#963D7F	150	61	127
	Yellow	#FDFD07		Green	#4F7948	79	121	72
	Orange	#FF8071		Black	#000000	0	0	0
	Red	#F4405D		Blue	#131391	19	19	145
	Pink	#FF8ABA		Yellow	#FFF7CC	255	247	204
				Color Changer	#FFE9D1	255	233	209

=== Color 'n Smell Crayons ===
Following previous issues with scented crayons in 1994 and 1995, Binney & Smith released a new line, known as "Color 'n Smell" crayons in 1997. None of the crayons were named after or given the scent of foods. The 16 crayons all consisted of regular Crayola colors.

Color	Name of scent	Name of Crayola Color	Hexadecimal	R	G	B
	Earthworm	Brick Red	#C62D42	198	45	66
	Smell the Roses	Red	#ED0A3F	237	10	63
	Pet Shop	Brown	#AF593E	175	89	62
	Baseball Mitt	Burnt Sienna	#E97451	233	116	81
	Grandma's Perfume	Orange	#FF8833	255	136	51
	Saw Dust	Peach	#FFCBA4	255	203	164
	Sharpening Pencils	Goldenrod	#FCD667	252	214	103
	Wash the Dog	Dandelion	#FED85D	254	216	93
	Sunny Day	Yellow	#FBE870	251	232	112
	Koala Tree	Jungle Green	#29AB87	41	171	135
	Pine Tree	Pine Green	#01796F	1	121	111
	Fresh Air	Sky Blue	#76D7EA	118	215	234
	Flower Shop	Wisteria	#C9A0DC	201	160	220
	Bubble Bath	Tickle Me Pink	#FC80A5	252	128	165
	Baby's Powder	White	#FFFFFF	255	255	255
	New Sneakers	Black	#000000	0	0	0

=== Star Brite Crayons ===
In 1997, Crayola released a 16-pack of Star Brite Crayons. However, it did not contain any color names. The hex triplets below are representative of the colors produced by the named crayons.

Color	Hexadecimal	R	G	B
	#F898C8	248	152	200
	#E91E63	233	30	99
	#D62518	214	37	24
	#AD0000	173	0	0
	#E63300	230	51	0
	#DE6900	222	105	0
	#FA7A00	250	122	0
	#CDDC39	205	220	57
	#00D8A0	0	216	160
	#1BA77B	27	167	123
	#004C71	0	76	113
	#1AADE0	26	173	224
	#0069BD	0	105	189
	#333399	51	51	153
	#56418C	86	65	140
	#212321	33	35	33

=== Color Mix-Up Crayons ===
In 1997, Crayola released a 16-pack of Color Mix-Up Crayons, each of which contains a solid color with flecks of two other colors in it. Colors in the chart below are approximated. The hex RGB values are in the order of the predominant color and then the flecks. Colors for crayons other than Mixed Veggies and Star Spangled Banner come from information on the crayon wrapper.

List of Color Mix-Up crayon colors
Crayon name	Primary color	Secondary color	Tertiary color
Baby's Blanket	#FF8ABA	#1F75FE	#1CAC78
Blazing Bonfire	#FCE883	#FF7538	#EE204D
Cool and Crazy	#FFFFFF	#7851A9	#0D98BA
Lemon Lime Zing	#FCE883	#1CAC78	#1F75FE
Magenta Mix-Up	#FCB4D5	#1F75FE	#C8385A
Mixed Veggies	#B6B650	#BD0B4C	#F2DD87
Off-Road	#DEAA88	#2B6CC4	#C8385A
Peaches 'n Cream	#FFFFFF	#FFCFAB	#FCE883
Rainforest	#6DAE81	#5D76CB	#7851A9
Shrimp Cocktail	#FFFFFF	#FF7538	#C8385A
Southwest	#FFFFFF	#FF7538	#5D76CB
Star Spangled Banner	#F8EFE6	#1F75FE	#EE204D
Stonewashed	#80DAEB	#2B6CC4	#C8385A
Surf's Up	#FFFFFF	#1CA9C9	#FCE883
Twister	#FFFFFF	#1CAC78	#FF7538
Warm and Fuzzy	#FF8ABA	#FF7538	#1F75FE

=== Pearl Brite Crayons ===
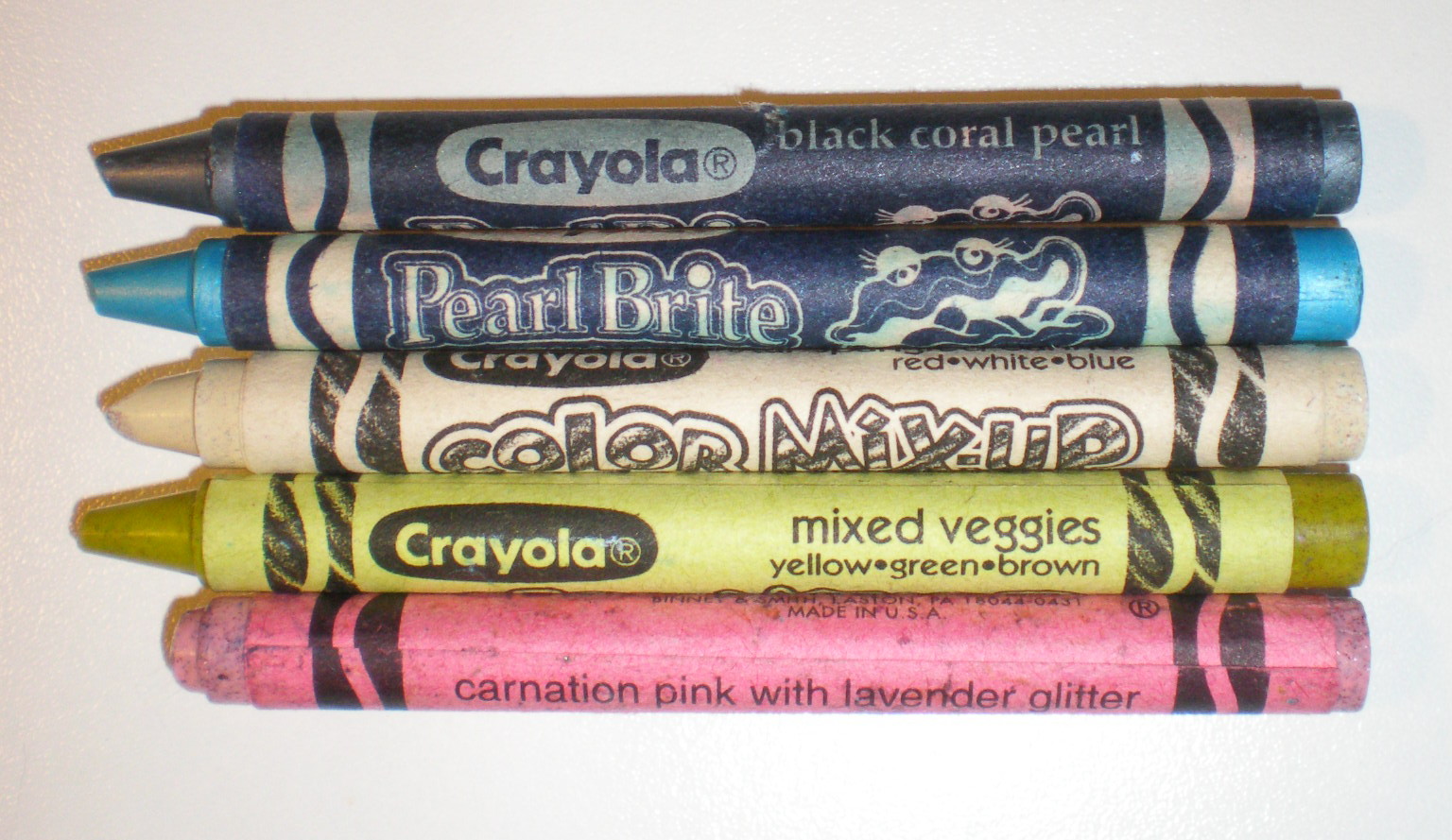
Crayola Pearl Brite Crayons, Color Mix-Up, and Crayons with Glitter

In 1997, Crayola released a 16-pack of Pearl Brite Crayons. These were designed to give soft pearlescent colors. These had a new wrapper design, black with a white oval Crayola logo and white text.

Color	Name	Hexadecimal	R	G	B
	Salmon Pearl	#F1444A	241	68	74
	Mandarin Pearl	#F37A48	243	122	72
	Sunset Pearl	#F1CC79	241	204	121
	Sunny Pearl	#F2F27A	242	242	122
	Key Lime Pearl	#E8F48C	232	244	140
	Caribbean Green Pearl	#6ADA8E	106	218	142
	Ocean Green Pearl	#48BF91	72	191	145
	Turquoise Pearl	#3BBCD0	59	188	208
	Aqua Pearl	#5FBED7	95	190	215
	Black Coral Pearl	#54626F	84	98	111
	Ocean Blue Pearl	#4F42B5	79	66	181
	Midnight Pearl	#702670	112	38	112
	Orchid Pearl	#7B4259	123	66	89
	Mystic Pearl	#D65282	214	82	130
	Rose Pearl	#F03865	240	56	101
	Cultured Pearl	#F5F5F5	245	245	245

=== Crayons with Glitter ===
In 1997, Crayola released Crayons with Glitter as part of a Special Effects crayons package. Starting as late as 1999, their crayon names do not appear on the crayon wrappers.

Primary Color	Primary Hexadecimal	Primary R	Primary G	Primary B	Glitter Color	Glitter Hexadecimal	Glitter R	Glitter G	Glitter B	Name
	#EE204D	238	32	77		#CDC5C2	205	197	194	Red with Shimmering Silver Glitter
	#FF7538	255	117	56		#77DDE7	119	221	231	Orange with Twinkling Turquoise Glitter
	#FCE883	252	232	131	Rainbow (no hex)					Yellow with Rainbow Glitter
	#C5E384	197	227	132		#CDC5C2	205	197	194	Yellow Green with Silver Glitter
	#1CAC78	28	172	120		#77DDE7	119	221	231	Green with Twinkling Turquoise Glitter
	#0D98BA	13	152	186		#E7C697	231	198	151	Blue Green with Glitzy Gold Glitter
	#80DAEB	128	218	235		#E7C697	231	198	151	Sky Blue with Glitzy Gold Glitter
	#1F75FE	31	117	254		#CDC5C2	205	197	194	Blue with Shimmering Silver Glitter
	#7851A9	120	81	169		#EE204D	238	32	77	Royal Purple with Ruby Red Glitter
	#E6A8D7	230	168	215		#77DDE7	119	221	231	Orchid with Twinkling Turquoise Glitter
	#C0448F	192	68	143		#E7C697	231	198	151	Red Violet with Glitzy Gold Glitter
	#FFAACC	255	170	204		#FCB4D5	252	180	213	Carnation Pink with Lavender Glitter
	#C8385A	200	56	90		#E7C697	231	198	151	Maroon with Glitzy Gold Glitter
	#FFFFFF	255	255	255	Rainbow (no hex)					White with Rainbow Glitter
	#FFFFFF	255	255	255		#E7C697	231	198	151	White with Glitzy Gold Glitter
	#000000	0	0	0		#E7C697	231	198	151	Black with Glitzy Gold Glitter

In 2019, Crayola released an updated version of Crayons with Glitter in a 24-count pack featuring new names:

List of Crayons with Glitter colors that came out in 2019
Primary Color	Primary Hexadecimal	Primary R	Primary G	Primary B	Glitter Color	Glitter Hexadecimal	Glitter R	Glitter G	Glitter B	Name
	#FD0E35	253	14	53		#CDC5C2	205	197	194	Crimson Clash
	#FE4C40	254	76	64	Rainbow	—	—	—	—	Confetti Sunset
	#FF7538	255	117	56		#77DDE7	119	221	231	Campfire Flicker
	#FFB97B	255	185	123		#E7C697	231	198	151	Shredded Cheddar
	#FCD667	252	214	103		#77DDE7	119	221	231	Golden Dust
	#FCE883	252	232	131	Rainbow	—	—	—	—	Sun Shower
	#C5E384	197	227	132		#CDC5C2	205	197	194	Wild Wasabi
	#1CAC78	28	172	120		#77DDE7	119	221	231	Gritty Green
	#00755E	0	117	94	Rainbow	—	—	—	—	Tropical Shower
	#80DAEB	128	218	235		#ED0A3F	237	10	63	Fire in the Sky
	#1F75FE	31	117	254		#CDC5C2	205	197	194	Blue Blazes
	#009DC4	0	157	196	Rainbow	—	—	—	—	Aqua Fizz
	#4F69C6	79	105	198		#CDC5C2	205	197	194	Night Sky
	#7851A9	120	81	169		#ED0A3F	237	10	63	Poppin' Purple
	#C0448F	192	68	143		#E7C697	231	198	151	Red Slaw
	#C8385A	200	56	90		#E7C697	231	198	151	Maroon Mist
	#E6A8D7	230	168	215		#77DDE7	119	221	231	Orchid Explosion
	#FC74FD	252	116	253	Rainbow	—	—	—	—	Flamingo Flame
	#AF593E	175	89	62		#E7C697	231	198	151	Chocolate Sprinkles
	#000000	0	0	0		#E7C697	231	198	151	Black Gold
	#8B8680	139	134	128		#CDC5C2	205	197	194	Gray Glam
	#D9D6CF	217	214	207		#CDC5C2	205	197	194	Silver Sparks
	#FFFFFF	255	255	255		#E7C697	231	198	151	Diamond Dazzle
	#C3CDE6	195	205	230		#77DDE7	119	221	231	Lavender Burst

=== Construction Paper Crayons ===
In 1998, Crayola introduced Construction Paper Crayons. The specialty line remained one of the longest running specialty lines they ever put out. The hex triplets below are representative of the colors produced by the named crayons.

Color	Hexadecimal	R	G	B
	#FFA3B1	255	163	177
	#F3715A	243	113	90
	#F37B70	243	123	112
	#FFAD59	255	173	89
	#FFE599	255	229	153
	#F8FC98	248	252	152
	#B4FFB4	180	255	180
	#12E3DB	18	227	219
	#00BCD4	0	188	212
	#03A9F4	3	169	244
	#4848FF	72	72	255
	#6A35CE	106	53	206
	#AA55AA	170	85	170
	#7F7FBF	127	127	191
	#795548	121	85	72
	#FFFFFF	255	255	255

=== Metallic FX Crayons ===
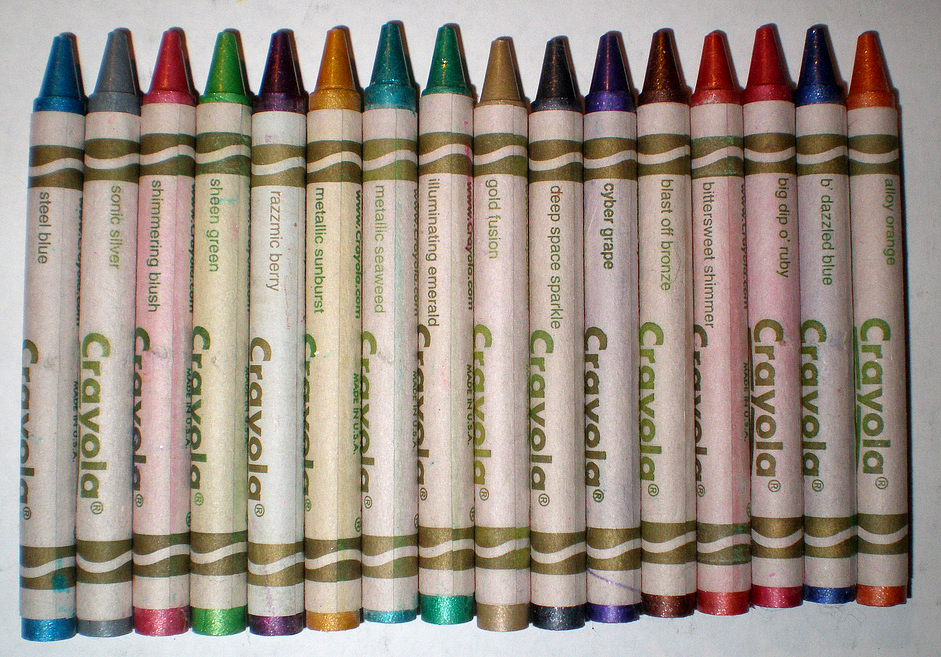
16 of the 24 Crayola Metallic FX crayon colors

In 2001, Crayola produced Metallic FX Crayons, a set of 16 metallic crayons whose names were chosen through a contest open to residents of the U.S. and Canada. The hex triplets below are representative of the colors produced by the named crayons. In 2019, an updated version was released under its original name of Metallic Crayons, adding eight more metallic colors for a total of 24. The original 16 colors are included in the special 152-count Ultimate Crayon Collection pack alongside 120 standard and 16 Crayons with Glitter. Four of the colors are included in the regular 96-count crayon box.

Metallic FX crayons
Color	Name	Hexadecimal	R	G	B	Pack Added	Notes
	Big Dip O' Ruby	#9C2542	156	37	66	96	
	Bittersweet Shimmer	#BF4F51	191	79	81		
	Alloy Orange	#C46210	196	98	16		
	Blast Off Bronze	#A57164	165	113	100		
	Gold Fusion	#85754E	133	117	78		
	Robot Canary	#9C7C38	156	124	56		Known as "Metallic Sunburst" (2001–2019).
	Cheese Grater	#C89F56	200	159	86		Introduced in 2019.
	Gold Medal	#C5BC42	197	188	66		Introduced in 2019.
	Sheen Green	#8FD400	143	212	0	96	
	Petrified Forest	#005B39	0	91	57		Introduced in 2019.
	Illuminating Emerald	#319177	49	145	119		
	Metallic Seaweed	#0A7E8C	10	126	140		
	Steel Blue	#0081AB	0	129	171	96	
	Acid Wash Jeans	#5CB2C5	92	178	197		Introduced in 2019.
	Cobalt Cool	#028AAE	2	138	174		Introduced in 2019.
	B'dazzled Blue	#2E5894	46	88	148		
	Iron Indigo	#184FA1	24	79	161		Introduced in 2019.
	Cyber Grape	#58427C	88	66	124	96	
	Razzmic Berry	#8D4E85	141	78	133		
	Shimmering Blush	#D98695	217	134	149		
	Rose Gold	#C88CA4	200	140	164		Introduced in 2019.
	Magnetic Magenta	#BF3981	191	57	129		Introduced in 2019.
	Deep Space Sparkle	#4A646C	74	100	108		
	Sonic Silver	#757575	117	117	117		

=== Gel FX Crayons ===
In 2001, Crayola produced Gel FX Crayons. However, it did not contain any color names. Four of the colors are included in the 96-count crayon box alongside four Metallic FX colors and are not included in the 152-count Ultimate Crayon Collection set. The hex triplets below are representative of the colors produced by the named crayons.

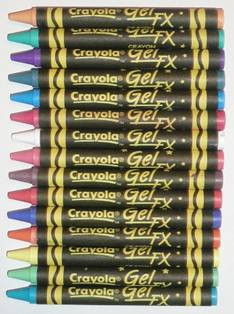
15 of the 16 Crayola Gel FX Crayons

Color	Hexadecimal	R	G	B	Pack Added
	#FF3399	255	51	153	96
	#FF6699	255	102	153	
	#F26D7D	242	109	125	
	#F58345	245	131	69	
	#FFBF7F	255	191	127	
	#F5FF7D	245	255	125	96
	#99FF99	153	255	153	
	#12E3DB	18	227	219	
	#00B6BD	0	182	189	96
	#0081FF	0	129	255	96
	#7092BE	112	146	190	
	#3F48CC	63	72	204	
	#7853A8	120	83	168	
	#A349A4	163	73	164	
	#8F5873	143	88	115	
	#FFFFFF	255	255	255	

=== Pearl Crayons ===
In 2019, a 24-count box of Pearl Crayons was released alongside the updated versions of the Metallic Crayons, Neon Crayons, and Crayons with Glitter.

Color	Name	Hexadecimal	R	G	B
	Red Satin	#9F3434	159	52	52
	Apple Orchard	#BF3F3F	191	63	63
	Butternut Squash	#E74F00	231	79	0
	Mango Purée	#FF6137	255	97	55
	Orange Peel	#FF8021	255	128	33
	Sunset Shimmer	#F79015	247	144	21
	Liquid Gold	#FFD966	255	217	102
	Shooting Star	#FFFF65	255	255	101
	Sea Glass	#C4EA7F	196	234	127
	Caribbean Sea	#67CD95	103	205	149
	Pesto	#5F7B4A	95	123	74
	Leafy Canopy	#94DDCB	148	221	203
	Ocean Foam	#62C9D3	98	201	211
	Cloudy Sky	#548CD0	84	140	208
	Iridescent Indigo	#3C32CD	60	50	205
	Moonlit Pond	#4F2CD0	79	44	208
	Lavender Silk	#6B4D82	107	77	130
	Berry Parfait	#A43482	164	52	130
	Bubble Gum	#DF9ACA	223	154	202
	Pink Luster	#FFB2E7	255	178	231
	Hot Cocoa	#8F482F	143	72	47
	Black Pearl	#3A3A3A	58	58	58
	Antique Gray	#9F9F9F	159	159	159
	Snow Drift	#F3F3F3	243	243	243

=== Neon Crayons ===
In 2019, a new 24 count of Neon Crayons was released. It includes eight fluorescent colors, eight pearl versions of the same colors, and the same eight colors with silver glitter.

List of Crayons with Glitter colors that came out in 2019
Primary Color	Primary Hexadecimal	Primary R	Primary G	Primary B	Glitter Color	Glitter Hexadecimal	Glitter R	Glitter G	Glitter B	Name
	#76D7EA	118	215	234		#E7C697	231	198	151	Sky Blue; Pearl Sky Blue; Glitter Sky Blue
	#66FF66	102	255	102		#CDC5C2	205	197	194	Screamin' Green; Pearl Screamin' Green; Glitter Screamin' Green
	#FFFF66	255	255	102		#77DDE7	119	221	231	Laser Lemon; Pearl Laser Lemon; Glitter Laser Lemon
	#FFCC33	255	204	51		#77DDE7	119	221	231	Sunglow; Pearl Sunglow; Glitter Sunglow
	#FF9966	255	153	102		#77DDE7	119	221	231	Atomic Tangerine; Pearl Atomic Tangerine; Glitter Atomic Tangerine
	#FD5B78	253	91	120		#E7C697	231	198	151	Wild Watermelon; Pearl Wild Watermelon; Glitter Wild Watermelon
	#FF00CC	255	0	204		#E7C697	231	198	151	Purple Pizzazz; Pearl Purple Pizzazz; Glitter Purple Pizzazz
	#FF6EFF	255	110	255		#77DDE7	119	221	231	Shocking Pink; Pearl Shocking Pink; Glitter Shocking Pink

=== Colors of the World Crayons ===
On May 21, 2020, the Colors of the World Crayons were announced. They were released in 32 and 24-count boxes in July 2020. The additional eight colors are standard colors with new names to fit the theme.

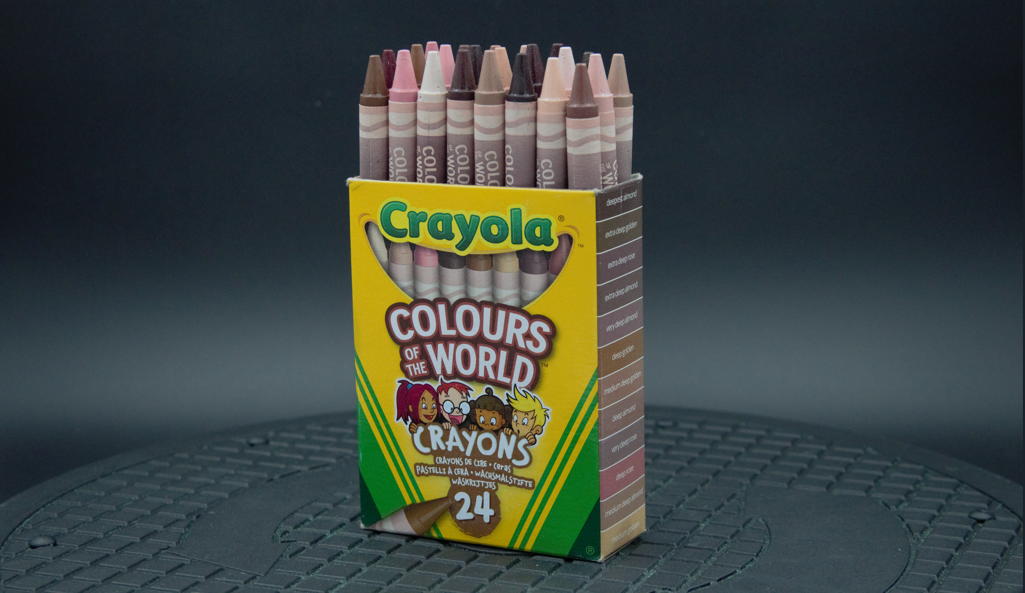
A box of Crayola Colors of the World crayons (note the spelling of "Colours")

Color	Name	Hexadecimal	R	G	B	Boxes
	Deepest Almond	#513529	81	53	41	24
	Extra Deep Almond	#6E5046	110	80	70	24
	Very Deep Almond	#88605E	136	96	94	24
	Deep Almond	#986A5A	152	106	90	24
	Medium Deep Almond	#AC8065	172	128	101	24
	Medium Almond	#D19C7D	209	156	125	24
	Light Medium Almond	#E0B5A4	224	181	164	24
	Light Almond	#E6B9B3	230	185	179	24
	Very Light Almond	#E6D2D3	230	210	211	24
	Extra Light Almond	#EEE6CF	238	230	207	24
	Extra Deep Golden	#5F452E	95	69	46	24
	Deep Golden	#8D5B28	141	91	40	24
	Medium Deep Golden	#A16B4F	161	107	79	24
	Medium Golden	#DEA26C	222	162	108	24
	Light Medium Golden	#F0C9A2	240	201	162	24
	Light Golden	#EDDBC7	237	219	199	24
	Very Light Golden	#F0DFCF	240	223	207	24
	Extra Deep Rose	#6C4D4B	108	77	75	24
	Very Deep Rose	#8F6C68	143	108	104	24
	Deep Rose	#B86F69	184	111	105	24
	Medium Deep Rose	#EE8E99	238	142	153	24
	Light Medium Rose	#F4AFB2	244	175	178	24
	Light Rose	#FAC7C3	250	199	195	24
	Very Light Rose	#F7E1E3	247	225	227	24
	Black Hair	#000000	0	0	0	32
	Blue Eyes	#6CDAE7	108	218	231	32
	Green Eyes	#7BA05B	123	160	91	32
	Blonde Hair	#FFFF99	255	255	153	32
	Hazel Eyes	#D27D46	210	125	70	32
	Brown Eyes	#AF593E	175	89	62	32
	Brown Hair	#9E5B40	158	91	64	32
	Red Hair	#CA3435	202	52	53	32

=== Silly Scents Crayons ===
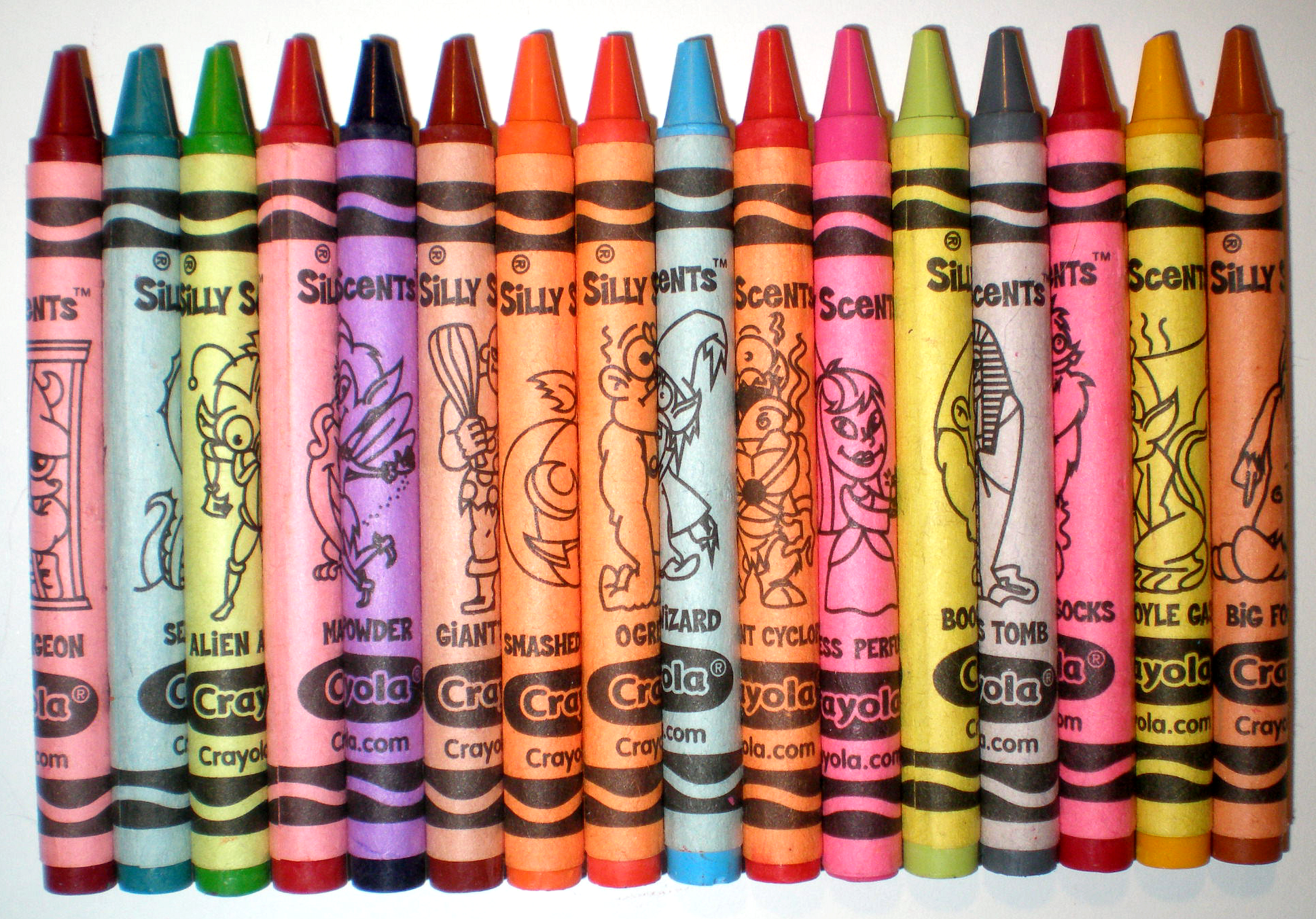
All 16 Crayola Silly Scents Crayons

The Silly Scents Crayons are produced by Crayola in a 16-pack. The 16 crayons all consisted of regular Crayola colors.

Color	Scent Name	Color Name	Hexadecimal	R	G	B
	Mummy's Tomb	Gray	#8B8680	139	134	128
	Giant's Club	Chestnut	#B94E48	185	78	72
	Big Foot Feet	Tan	#D99A6C	217	154	108
	Booger Buster	Spring Green	#ECEBBD	236	235	189
	Gargoyle Gas	Dandelion	#FED85D	254	216	93
	Alien Armpit	Yellow Green	#C5E17A	197	225	122
	Sea Serpent	Robin's Egg Blue	#00CCCC	0	204	204
	Winter Wizard	Sky Blue	#76D7EA	118	215	234
	Pixie Powder	Blue Violet	#6456B7	100	86	183
	Dingy Dungeon	Maroon	#C32148	195	33	72
	Magic Potion	Red	#ED0A3F	237	10	63
	Princess Perfume	Tickle Me Pink	#FC80A5	252	128	165
	Sasquatch Socks	Violet Red	#F7468A	247	70	138
	Ogre Odor	Red Orange	#FF681F	255	104	31
	Smashed Pumpkin	Orange	#FF8833	255	136	51
	Sunburnt Cyclops	Mango Tango	#E77200	231	114	0

=== Heads 'n Tails Crayons ===
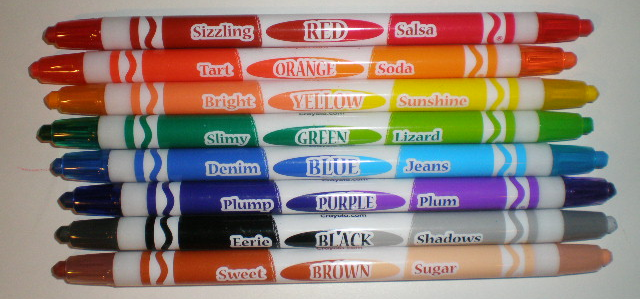
All 16 Crayola Heads 'n Tails crayon colors

The eight Heads 'n Tails Crayons are double-sided and encased in plastic tubes that function much like the ones on Crayola Twistables. Each crayon has two shades of color, for a total of 16 colors, which are approximated by the background colors and hex RGB values below.

Color	Hexadecimal	Name	Name	Hexadecimal	R	G	B	Color
	#FF3855	Sizzling Red	Red Salsa	#FD3A4A	253	58	74	
	#FB4D46	Tart Orange	Orange Soda	#FA5B3D	250	91	61	
	#FFAA1D	Bright Yellow	Yellow Sunshine	#FFF700	255	247	0	
	#299617	Slimy Green	Green Lizard	#A7F432	167	244	50	
	#2243B6	Denim Blue	Blue Jeans	#5DADEC	93	173	236	
	#5946B2	Plump Purple	Purple Plum	#9C51B6	156	81	182	
	#A83731	Sweet Brown	Brown Sugar	#AF6E4D	175	110	77	
	#1B1B1B	Eerie Black	Black Shadows	#BFAFB2	191	175	178	

=== The 100,000,000,000th Crayon ===
In 1996, Crayola celebrated the creation of their 100 billionth crayon by publishing a Crayon called Blue Ribbon. This crayon was only present in certain crayon 96-packs.

Color	Name	Hexadecimal	R	G	B
	Blue Ribbon	#0B10A2	11	16	162

== Twistables ==
=== 24-pack Mini Twistables ===
In 2004, Crayola released a set of 24 Mini Twistables crayons. They are nearly half the size of large twistable crayons. The colors' hexadecimal values are shown below. The colors are from the standard list of crayon colors.

Color	Name	Hexadecimal	R	G	B
	Black	#000000	0	0	0
	Gray	#95918C	149	145	140
	White	#FFFFFF	255	255	255
	Blue	#1F75FE	31	117	254
	Cerulean	#1DACD6	29	172	214
	Blue Green	#0D98BA	13	152	186
	Indigo	#5D76CB	93	118	203
	Blue Violet	#7366BD	115	102	189
	Violet (Purple)	#926EAE	146	110	174
	Red Violet	#C0448F	192	68	143
	Carnation Pink	#FFAACC	255	170	204
	Violet Red	#F75394	247	83	148
	Red	#EE204D	238	32	77
	Scarlet	#FC2847	252	40	71
	Red Orange	#FF5349	255	83	73
	Orange	#FF7538	255	117	56
	Apricot	#FDD9B5	253	217	181
	Brown	#B4674D	180	103	77
	Yellow Orange	#FFAE42	255	174	66
	Dandelion	#FDDB6D	253	219	109
	Yellow	#FCE883	252	232	131
	Green Yellow	#F0E891	240	232	145
	Yellow Green	#C5E384	197	227	132
	Green	#1CAC78	28	172	120

=== Fun Effects Mini Twistables ===
In 2004, Crayola released a 24 pack of Fun Effects Mini Twistables crayons. It contains eight eXtreme colors, eight metallic colors, and eight rainbow colors.

=== True to Life Crayons ===
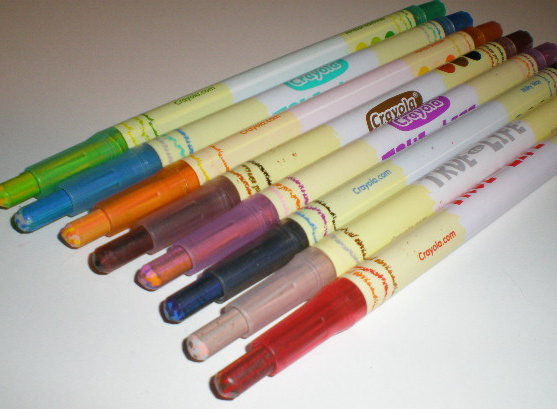
All eight Crayola True to Life crayon colors

In 2007, Crayola released a set of eight True to Life Crayons. Each crayon is extra-long and contained within a plastic casing similar to that of Crayola Twistables crayons. In the table, the background approximates the primary color and the text is in the two supporting colors. The approximate RGB hex values for each are given as well.

Crayon name	Primary	Secondary	Tertiary
Amazon Forest	#92F646	#FDFE03	#CBFB07
Caribbean Current	#5D8DDF	#DACED2	#30D6A4
Florida Sunrise	#FFB329	#FFD82C	#FFCC6B
Grand Canyon	#6D3834	#B36058	#000000
Maui Sunset	#8E599F	#EC872B	#FA79B9
Milky Way	#070707	#8D479D	#6E7FE7
Sahara Desert	#F5CBBD	#B06E54	#D0C6C6
Yosemite Campfire	#ED4C44	#EF8E30	#A95E34

=== Confetti Crayon ===
Crayola released a set of 24 Confetti Crayons in 2020. They each contain three colors: one main color, which is displayed outwardly, and two other colors, which are speckled in small bubbles throughout the crayon.

== See also ==
- History of Crayola crayons
- Timeline of Crayola
- Lists of colors
