= List of colors: A–F =

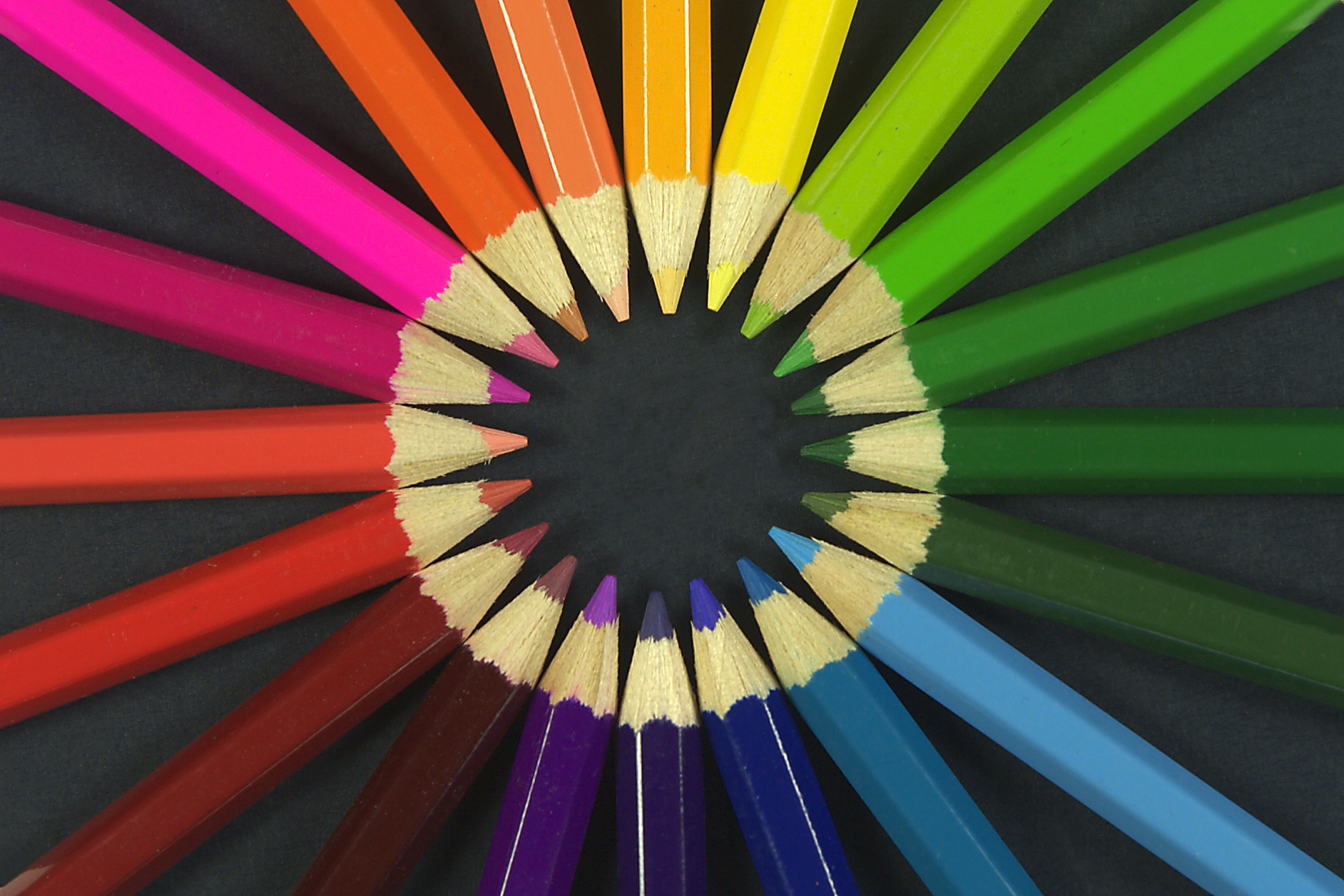
Colors are an important part of visual arts, fashion, interior design, and many other fields and disciplines.

The following is a list of colors. A number of the color swatches below are taken from domain-specific naming schemes such as X11 or HTML4. RGB values are given for each swatch because such standards are defined in terms of the sRGB color space. It is not possible to accurately convert many of these swatches to CMYK values because of the differing gamuts of the two spaces, but the color management systems built into operating systems and image editing software attempt such conversions as accurately as possible.

The HSV (hue, saturation, value) color space values, also known as HSB (hue, saturation, brightness), and the hex triplets (for HTML web colors) are also given in the following table. Some environments (like Microsoft Excel) reverse the order of bytes in hex color values (i.e. to "BGR"). Colors that appear on the web-safe color palette—which includes the sixteen named colors—are noted. (Those four named colors corresponding to the neutral greys have no hue value, which is effectively ignored—i.e., left blank.)

== Colors in alphabetical order A–F ==
Colors
Name	Hex (RGB)	Red (RGB)	Green (RGB)	Blue (RGB)	Hue (HSL/HSV)	Satur. (HSL)	Light (HSL)	Satur. (HSV)	Value (HSV)	Source
Absolute Zero	#0048BA	0%	28%	73%	217°	100%	37%	100%	73%	Crayola
Acid green	#B0BF1A	69%	75%	10%	65°	76%	43%	76%	75%	Art Paints YG07S
Aero	#7CB9E8	49%	73%	91%	206°	70%	70%	47%	91%	Maerz and Paul
African violet	#B284BE	70%	52%	75%	288°	31%	63%	31.5%	75%	Pantone
Air superiority blue	#72A0C1	45%	63%	76%	205°	39%	60%	41%	76%	Federal Standard 595
Alice blue	#F0F8FF	94%	97%	100%	208°	100%	97%	6%	100%	X11/Web
Alizarin	#DB2D43	86%	18%	26%	352°	71%	52%	79%	86%	Maerz and Paul
Alloy orange	#C46210	77%	38%	6%	27°	85%	42%	92%	77%	Crayola
Almond	#EED9C4	93%	85%	77%	30°	55%	85%	18%	93%	Crayola
Amaranth deep purple	#9F2B68	62%	17%	41%	328°	57%	40%	73%	62%	Maerz and Paul
Amaranth pink	#F19CBB	95%	61%	73%	338°	75%	78%	35%	95%	Maerz and Paul
Amaranth purple	#AB274F	67%	15%	31%	342°	63%	41%	77%	67%	Maerz and Paul
Amazon	#3B7A57	23%	48%	34%	147°	35%	36%	52%	48%	Xona.com
Amber	#FFBF00	100%	75%	0%	45°	100%	50%	100%	100%	RGB color model
Amethyst	#9966CC	60%	40%	80%	270°	50%	60%	50%	80%	htmlcsscolor
Android green	#3DDC84	24%	86%	53%	148°	69%	55%	72%	86%	Google
Antique brass	#C88A65	78%	54%	40%	22°	47%	59%	49%	78%	Crayola
Antique bronze	#665D1E	40%	36%	12%	53°	55%	26%	71%	40%	ISCC-NBS
Antique fuchsia	#915C83	57%	36%	51%	316°	22%	46%	37%	57%	Plochere
Antique ruby	#841B2D	52%	11%	18%	350°	66%	31%	80%	52%	ISCC-NBS
Antique white	#FAEBD7	98%	92%	84%	34°	78%	91%	14%	98%	X11/Web
Apricot	#FBCEB1	98%	81%	69%	24°	90%	84%	29%	98%	Maerz and Paul
Aqua	#00FFFF	0%	100%	100%	180°	100%	50%	100%	100%	X11/Web
Aquamarine	#7FFFD4	50%	100%	83%	160°	100%	75%	50%	100%	X11/Web
Arctic lime	#D0FF14	82%	100%	8%	72°	100%	54%	92%	100%	Crayola
Argentinian Blue	#74ACDF	45%	67%	91%	209°	73%	68%	48%	87%	Color-Name.com
Artichoke green	#4B6F44	29%	44%	27%	110°	24%	35%	39%	44%	Pantone
Arylide yellow	#E9D66B	91%	84%	42%	51°	74%	67%	54%	91%	ColorHexa
Ash gray	#B2BEB5	70%	75%	71%	135°	9%	72%	6%	75%	ISCC-NBS
Atomic tangerine	#FF9966	100%	60%	40%	20°	100%	70%	60%	100%	Crayola
Aureolin	#FDEE00	99%	93%	0%	56°	100%	50%	100%	99%	HTML-Color.Codes
Azure	#007FFF	0%	50%	100%	210°	100%	50%	100%	100%	RGB color model
Azure (X11/web color)	#F0FFFF	94%	100%	100%	180°	100%	97%	6%	100%	X11/Web
Baby blue	#89CFF0	54%	81%	94%	199°	77%	74%	43%	94%	Maerz and Paul
Baby blue eyes	#A1CAF1	63%	79%	95%	209°	74%	79%	33%	95%	Plochere
Baby pink	#F4C2C2	96%	76%	76%	0°	69%	86%	20%	96%	ISCC-NBS
Baby powder	#FEFEFA	100%	100%	98%	60°	67%	99%	2%	100%	Crayola
Baker-Miller pink	#FF91AF	100%	57%	69%	344°	100%	78%	43%	100%	Byrne
Banana Mania	#FAE7B5	98%	91%	71%	43°	87%	85%	28%	98%	Crayola
Banana yellow	#FFE135	100%	88%	21%	51°	100%	60%	79%	100%	ArtyClick
Barbie Pink	#DA1884	85%	9%	52%	327°	80%	48%	89%	85%	Mattel/Pantone
Barn red	#7C0A02	49%	4%	1%	4°	97%	25%	98%	49%	Milk Paint
Battleship grey	#848482	52%	52%	51%	60°	1%	51%	2%	52%	ISCC-NBS
Beau blue	#BCD4E6	74%	83%	90%	206°	46%	82%	18%	90%	Plochere
Beaver	#9F8170	62%	51%	44%	22°	20%	53%	30%	62%	Crayola
Beige	#F5F5DC	96%	96%	86%	60°	56%	91%	10%	96%	X11/Web
B'dazzled blue	#2E5894	18%	35%	58%	215°	53%	38%	69%	58%	Crayola
Big dip o’ruby	#9C2542	61%	15%	26%	345°	62%	38%	76%	61%	Crayola
Bisque	#FFE4C4	100%	89%	77%	33°	100%	88%	23%	100%	X11/Web
Bistre	#3D2B1F	24%	17%	12%	24°	33%	18%	49%	24%	99colors.net
Bistre brown	#967117	59%	44%	9%	43°	73%	34%	85%	59%	ISCC-NBS
Bitter lemon	#CAE00D	79%	88%	5%	66°	89%	47%	94%	88%	Xona.com
Bittersweet	#FE6F5E	100%	44%	37%	6°	99%	68%	99%	68%	99colors.net
Black	#000000	0%	0%	0%	—°	0%	0%	0%	0%	RGB color model
Black bean	#3D0C02	24%	5%	1%	10°	94%	12%	97%	24%	Xona.com
Black coral	#54626F	33%	38%	44%	209°	14%	38%	24%	44%	Crayola
Black olive	#3B3C36	23%	24%	21%	70°	5%	22%	10%	24%	RAL
Black Shadows	#BFAFB2	75%	69%	70%	349°	11%	72%	8%	75%	Crayola
Blanched almond	#FFEBCD	100%	92%	80%	36°	100%	90%	20%	100%	X11/Web
Blast-off bronze	#A57164	65%	44%	39%	12°	27%	52%	39%	65%	Crayola
Bleu de France	#318CE7	19%	55%	91%	210°	79%	55%	79%	91%	Pourpre.com
Blizzard blue	#ACE5EE	67%	90%	93%	188°	66%	80%	28%	93%	Crayola
Blood red	#660000	40%	0%	0%	0°	100%	20%	100%	40%	Thom Poole
Blue	#0000FF	0%	0%	100%	240°	100%	50%	100%	100%	X11/Web
Blue (Crayola)	#1F75FE	12%	46%	100%	217°	99%	56%	88%	100%	Crayola
Blue (Munsell)	#0093AF	0%	58%	69%	190°	100%	34%	100%	69%	Munsell color wheel
Blue (NCS)	#0087BD	0%	53%	74%	197°	100%	37%	100%	74%	Natural color system
Blue (Pantone)	#0018A8	0%	9%	66%	231°	100%	33%	100%	66%	Pantone
Blue (pigment)	#333399	20%	20%	60%	240°	50%	40%	67%	60%	CMYK color model
Blue bell	#A2A2D0	64%	64%	82%	240°	33%	73%	22%	82%	Crayola
Blue-gray (Crayola)	#6699CC	40%	60%	80%	210°	50%	60%	50%	80%	Crayola
Blue jeans	#5DADEC	36%	68%	93%	206°	79%	65%	61%	93%	Crayola
Blue sapphire	#126180	7%	38%	50%	197°	75%	29%	86%	50%	Pantone
Blue-violet	#8A2BE2	54%	17%	89%	271°	76%	53%	81%	89%	X11/Web
Blue yonder	#5072A7	31%	45%	65%	217°	35%	48%	52%	65%	Pantone
Bluetiful	#3C69E7	24%	41%	91%	224°	78%	57%	74%	91%	Crayola
Blush	#DE5D83	87%	36%	51%	342°	66%	62%	58%	87%	Crayola
Bole	#79443B	47%	27%	23%	9°	34%	35%	51%	47%	ISCC-NBS
Bone	#E3DAC9	89%	85%	79%	39°	32%	84%	11%	89%	Kelly-Moore
Brick red	#CB4154	80%	25%	33%	352°	57%	53%	68%	80%	Crayola
Bright lilac	#D891EF	85%	57%	94%	285°	75%	75%	39%	94%	Crayola
Bright yellow (Crayola)	#FFAA1D	100%	67%	11%	37°	100%	56%	89%	100%	Crayola
British racing green	#004225	0%	26%	15%	154°	100%	13%	100%	26%	ColorHexa
Bronze	#CD7F32	80%	50%	20%	30°	61%	50%	76%	80%	Maerz and Paul
Brown	#964B00	59%	29%	0%	30°	100%	29%	100%	59%	ColorXS
Brown sugar	#AF6E4D	69%	43%	30%	20°	39%	49%	56%	69%	Crayola
Bud green	#7BB661	48%	71%	38%	102°	37%	55%	47%	71%	Pantone
Buff	#FFC680	100%	78%	50%	33°	100%	75%	50%	100%	Maerz and Paul
Burgundy	#800020	50%	0%	13%	345°	100%	25%	100%	50%	Maerz and Paul
Burlywood	#DEB887	87%	72%	53%	34°	57%	70%	39%	87%	X11/Web
Burnished brown	#A17A74	63%	48%	45%	8°	19%	54%	28%	63%	Crayola
Burnt orange	#CC5500	80%	33%	0%	25°	100%	40%	100%	80%	University of Texas at Austin
Burnt sienna	#E97451	91%	45%	32%	14°	78%	62%	65%	91%	Ferrario 1919
Burnt umber	#8A3324	54%	20%	14%	9°	59%	34%	74%	54%	Xona.com
Byzantine	#BD33A4	74%	20%	64%	311°	58%	47%	73%	74%	Maerz and Paul
Byzantium	#702963	44%	16%	39%	311°	46%	30%	63%	44%	ISCC-NBS
Cadet blue	#5F9EA0	37%	62%	63%	182°	26%	50%	41%	63%	X11/Web
Cadet grey	#91A3B0	57%	64%	69%	205°	16%	63%	18%	69%	ISCC-NBS
Cadmium green	#006B3C	0%	42%	24%	154°	100%	21%	100%	42%	ISCC-NBS
Cadmium orange	#ED872D	93%	53%	18%	28°	84%	55%	81%	93%	ISCC-NBS
Café au lait	#A67B5B	65%	48%	36%	26°	30%	50%	45%	65%	ISCC-NBS
Café noir	#4B3621	29%	21%	13%	30°	39%	21%	56%	29%	ISCC-NBS
Cambridge blue	#A3C1AD	64%	76%	68%	140°	20%	70%	16%	76%	University of Cambridge
Camel	#C19A6B	76%	60%	42%	33°	41%	59%	45%	76%	ISCC-NBS
Cameo pink	#EFBBCC	94%	73%	80%	340°	62%	84%	22%	94%	ISCC-NBS
Canary	#FFFF99	100%	100%	60%	60°	100%	80%	40%	100%	Crayola
Canary yellow	#FFEF00	100%	94%	0%	56°	100%	50%	100%	100%	CMYK color model
Candy pink	#E4717A	89%	44%	48%	355°	68%	67%	50%	89%	ISCC-NBS
Cardinal	#C41E3A	77%	12%	23%	350°	74%	44%	85%	77%	Maerz and Paul
Caribbean green	#00CC99	0%	80%	60%	165°	100%	40%	100%	80%	Crayola
Carmine	#960018	59%	0%	9%	350°	100%	29%	100%	59%	Pourpre.com
Carmine (M&P)	#D70040	84%	0%	25%	342°	100%	42%	100%	84%	Maerz and Paul
Carnation pink	#FFA6C9	100%	65%	79%	336°	100%	83%	35%	100%	Crayola
Carnelian	#B31B1B	70%	11%	11%	0°	74%	40%	85%	70%	Cornell University
Carolina blue	#56A0D3	34%	63%	83%	204°	59%	58%	59%	83%	University of North Carolina
Carrot orange	#ED9121	93%	57%	13%	33°	85%	53%	86%	93%	Maerz and Paul
Catawba	#703642	44%	21%	26%	348°	35%	33%	52%	44%	Maerz and Paul
Cedar Chest	#C95A49	79%	35%	29%	8°	54%	54%	64%	79%	Crayola
Celadon	#ACE1AF	67%	88%	69%	123°	47%	78%	24%	88%	encycolorpedia.com
Celeste	#B2FFFF	70%	100%	100%	180°	100%	85%	30%	100%	Fantetti and Petracchi
Cerise	#DE3163	87%	19%	39%	343°	72%	53%	78%	87%	Maerz and Paul
Cerulean	#007BA7	0%	48%	65%	196°	100%	33%	100%	65%	Maerz and Paul
Cerulean blue	#2A52BE	16%	32%	75%	224°	64%	46%	78%	75%	Maerz and Paul
Cerulean frost	#6D9BC3	43%	61%	76%	208°	42%	60%	44%	76%	Crayola
Cerulean (Crayola)	#1DACD6	11%	67%	84%	194°	76%	48%	86%	84%	Crayola
Cerulean (RGB)	#0040FF	0%	25%	100%	225°	100%	50%	100%	100%	
Champagne	#F7E7CE	97%	91%	81%	37°	72%	89%	17%	97%	Maerz and Paul
Champagne pink	#F1DDCF	95%	87%	81%	25°	55%	88%	14%	95%	Pantone
Charcoal	#36454F	21%	27%	31%	204°	19%	26%	32%	31%	ISCC-NBS
Charm pink	#E68FAC	90%	56%	67%	340°	64%	73%	38%	90%	Plochere
Chartreuse (web)	#80FF00	50%	100%	0%	90°	100%	50%	100%	100%	RGB color model
Cherry blossom pink	#FFB7C5	100%	72%	77%	348°	100%	86%	28%	100%	Maerz and Paul
Chestnut	#954535	58%	27%	21%	10°	48%	40%	64%	58%	Maerz and Paul
Chili red	#E23D28	89%	24%	16%	7°	76%	52%	82%	89%	Flag of South Africa
China pink	#DE6FA1	87%	44%	63%	333°	63%	65%	50%	87%	Plochere
Chinese red	#AA381E	67%	22%	12%	11°	70%	39%	82%	67%	ISCC-NBS
Chinese violet	#856088	52%	38%	53%	296°	17%	46%	29%	53%	Pantone
Chinese yellow	#FFB200	100%	70%	0%	42°	100%	50%	100%	100%	ISCC-NBS
Chocolate (traditional)	#7B3F00	48%	25%	0%	31°	100%	24%	100%	48%	Maerz and Paul
Chocolate (web)	#D2691E	82%	41%	12%	25°	75%	47%	86%	82%	X11/Web
Cinereous	#98817B	60%	51%	48%	12°	12%	54%	19%	60%	Maerz and Paul
Cinnabar	#E34234	89%	26%	20%	5°	76%	55%	77%	89%	Maerz and Paul
Cinnamon Satin	#CD607E	80%	38%	49%	343°	52%	59%	53%	80%	Crayola
Citrine	#E4D00A	89%	82%	4%	54°	92%	47%	96%	89%	Maerz and Paul
Citron	#9FA91F	62%	66%	12%	64°	69%	39%	82%	66%	Xona.com
Claret	#7F1734	50%	9%	20%	343°	69%	29%	82%	50%	Xona.com
Coffee	#6F4E37	44%	31%	22%	25°	34%	33%	50%	44%	ISCC-NBS
Columbia Blue	#B9D9EB	73%	85%	92%	202°	56%	82%	21%	92%	Columbia University
Congo pink	#F88379	97%	51%	47%	5°	90%	72%	51%	97%	ISCC-NBS
Connor's Lakefront	#175A6C	9%	35%	42%	193°	65%	26%	79%	42%	Sherwin-Williams
Cool grey	#8C92AC	55%	57%	67%	229°	16%	61%	19%	67%	ISCC-NBS
Copper	#B87333	72%	45%	20%	29°	57%	46%	72%	72%	Maerz and Paul
Copper (Crayola)	#DA8A67	85%	54%	40%	18°	61%	63%	53%	85%	Crayola
Copper penny	#AD6F69	68%	44%	41%	5°	29%	55%	39%	68%	Crayola
Copper red	#CB6D51	80%	43%	32%	14°	54%	56%	60%	80%	ISCC-NBS
Copper rose	#996666	60%	40%	40%	0°	20%	50%	33%	60%	99colors.net
Coquelicot	#FF3800	100%	22%	0%	13°	100%	50%	100%	100%	ColorHexa
Coral	#FF7F50	100%	50%	31%	16°	100%	66%	69%	100%	X11/Web
Coral pink	#F88379	97%	51%	47%	5°	90%	72%	51%	97%	ISCC-NBS
Cordovan	#893F45	54%	25%	27%	355°	37%	39%	54%	54%	Pantone
Corn	#FBEC5D	98%	93%	36%	54°	95%	68%	63%	98%	Maerz and Paul
Cornflower blue	#6495ED	39%	58%	93%	219°	79%	66%	58%	93%	X11/Web
Cornsilk	#FFF8DC	100%	97%	86%	48°	100%	93%	14%	100%	X11/Web
Cosmic cobalt	#2E2D88	18%	18%	53%	241°	50%	36%	67%	53%	Crayola
Cosmic latte	#FFF8E7	100%	97%	91%	43°	100%	95%	9%	100%	Glazebrook and Baldry
Coyote brown	#81613C	51%	38%	24%	32°	37%	37%	52%	51%	colorcode.is
Cotton candy	#FFBCD9	100%	74%	85%	334°	100%	87%	26%	100%	Crayola
Cream	#FFFDD0	100%	99%	82%	57°	100%	91%	18%	100%	Maerz and Paul
Crimson	#DC143C	86%	8%	24%	348°	83%	47%	91%	86%	X11/Web
Crimson (UA)	#9E1B32	62%	11%	20%	349°	71%	36%	83%	62%	University of Alabama
Cultured Pearl	#F5F5F5	96%	96%	96%	—°	0%	96%	0%	96%	Crayola
Cyan	#00FFFF	0%	100%	100%	180°	100%	50%	100%	100%	X11/Web
Cyan (process)	#00B7EB	0%	72%	92%	193°	100%	46%	100%	92%	CMYK color model
Cyber grape	#58427C	35%	26%	49%	263°	31%	37%	47%	49%	Crayola
Cyber yellow	#FFD300	100%	83%	0%	50°	100%	50%	100%	100%	Pantone
Cyclamen	#F56FA1	96%	44%	63%	338°	87%	70%	54%	96%	Crayola
Dandelion	#FED85D	100%	85%	36%	46°	99%	68%	63%	100%	Crayola
Dark brown	#654321	40%	26%	13%	30°	51%	26%	67%	40%	X11/Web
Dark byzantium	#5D3954	36%	22%	33%	315°	24%	29%	39%	36%	ISCC-NBS
Dark cyan	#008B8B	0%	55%	55%	180°	100%	27%	100%	55%	X11/Web
Dark electric blue	#536878	33%	41%	47%	206°	18%	40%	31%	47%	ISCC-NBS
Dark goldenrod	#B8860B	72%	53%	4%	43°	89%	38%	94%	72%	X11/Web
Dark green (X11)	#006400	0%	39%	0%	120°	100%	20%	100%	39%	X11/Web
Dark jungle green	#1A2421	10%	14%	13%	162°	16%	12%	28%	14%	ISCC-NBS
Dark khaki	#BDB76B	74%	72%	42%	56°	38%	58%	43%	74%	X11/Web
Dark lava	#483C32	28%	24%	20%	27°	18%	24%	31%	28%	ISCC-NBS
Dark liver (horses)	#543D37	33%	24%	22%	12°	21%	27%	35%	33%	University of California, Davis
Dark magenta	#8B008B	55%	0%	55%	300°	100%	27%	100%	55%	X11/Web
Dark olive green	#556B2F	33%	42%	18%	82°	39%	30%	56%	42%	X11/Web
Dark orange	#FF8C00	100%	55%	0%	33°	100%	50%	100%	100%	X11/Web
Dark orchid	#9932CC	60%	20%	80%	280°	61%	50%	75%	80%	X11/Web
Dark purple	#301934	19%	10%	20%	291°	35%	15%	51%	20%	ISCC-NBS
Dark red	#8B0000	55%	0%	0%	0°	100%	27%	100%	55%	X11/Web
Dark salmon	#E9967A	91%	59%	48%	15°	72%	70%	48%	91%	X11/Web
Dark sea green	#8FBC8F	56%	74%	56%	120°	25%	65%	24%	74%	X11/Web
Dark sienna	#3C1414	24%	8%	8%	0°	50%	16%	67%	24%	ISCC-NBS
Dark sky blue	#8CBED6	55%	75%	84%	199°	47%	69%	35%	84%	Pantone
Dark slate blue	#483D8B	28%	24%	55%	248°	39%	39%	56%	55%	X11/Web
Dark slate gray	#2F4F4F	18%	31%	31%	180°	25%	25%	41%	31%	X11/Web
Dark spring green	#177245	9%	45%	27%	150°	66%	27%	80%	45%	X11/Web
Dark turquoise	#00CED1	0%	81%	82%	181°	100%	41%	100%	82%	X11/Web
Dark violet	#9400D3	58%	0%	83%	282°	100%	41%	100%	83%	X11/Web
Davy's grey	#555555	33%	33%	33%	—°	0%	33%	0%	33%	ISCC-NBS
Deep cerise	#DA3287	85%	20%	53%	330°	69%	53%	77%	85%	Crayola
Deep champagne	#FAD6A5	98%	84%	65%	35°	90%	81%	34%	98%	ISCC-NBS
Deep chestnut	#B94E48	73%	31%	28%	3°	45%	50%	61%	73%	Crayola
Deep jungle green	#004B49	0%	29%	29%	178°	100%	15%	100%	29%	ISCC-NBS
Deep pink	#FF1493	100%	8%	58%	328°	100%	54%	92%	100%	X11/Web
Deep saffron	#FF9933	100%	60%	20%	30°	100%	60%	80%	100%	Flag of India
Deep sky blue	#00BFFF	0%	75%	100%	195°	100%	50%	100%	100%	X11/Web
Deep Space Sparkle	#4A646C	29%	39%	42%	194°	19%	36%	31%	42%	Crayola
Deep taupe	#7E5E60	49%	37%	38%	356°	15%	43%	25%	49%	Pantone
Denim	#1560BD	8%	38%	74%	213°	80%	41%	89%	74%	Crayola
Denim blue	#2243B6	13%	26%	71%	227°	69%	42%	81%	71%	Crayola
Desert	#C19A6B	76%	60%	42%	33°	41%	59%	45%	76%	ISCC-NBS
Desert sand	#EDC9AF	93%	79%	69%	25°	63%	81%	26%	93%	Crayola
Dim gray	#696969	41%	41%	41%	—°	0%	41%	0%	41%	X11/Web
Dodger blue	#1E90FF	12%	56%	100%	210°	100%	56%	88%	100%	X11/Web
Drab dark brown	#4A412A	29%	25%	16%	43°	28%	23%	43%	29%	Pantone
Duke blue	#00009C	0%	0%	61%	240°	100%	31%	100%	61%	Duke University
Dutch white	#EFDFBB	94%	87%	73%	42°	62%	84%	22%	94%	Resene
Ebony	#555D50	33%	36%	31%	97°	8%	34%	14%	36%	Maerz and Paul
Ecru	#C2B280	76%	70%	50%	45°	35%	63%	34%	76%	ISCC-NBS
Eerie black	#1B1B1B	11%	11%	11%	—°	0%	11%	0%	11%	Crayola
Eggplant	#614051	38%	25%	32%	329°	21%	32%	34%	38%	Crayola
Eggshell	#F0EAD6	94%	92%	84%	46°	46%	89%	11%	94%	ISCC-NBS
Electric lime	#CCFF00	80%	100%	0%	72°	100%	50%	100%	100%	Crayola
Electric purple	#BF00FF	75%	0%	100%	285°	100%	50%	100%	100%	X11/Web
Electric violet	#8F00FF	56%	0%	100%	274°	100%	50%	100%	100%	ISCC-NBS
Emerald	#50C878	31%	78%	47%	140°	52%	55%	60%	78%	Maerz and Paul
Eminence	#6C3082	42%	19%	51%	284°	46%	35%	63%	51%	Xona.com
English lavender	#B48395	71%	51%	58%	338°	25%	61%	27%	71%	Pantone
English red	#AB4B52	67%	29%	32%	356°	39%	48%	56%	67%	ISCC-NBS
English vermillion	#CC474B	80%	28%	29%	358°	57%	54%	65%	80%	Crayola
English violet	#563C5C	34%	24%	36%	289°	21%	30%	35%	36%	ISCC-NBS
Erin	#00FF40	0%	100%	25%	135°	100%	50%	100%	100%	Maerz and Paul
Eton blue	#96C8A2	59%	78%	64%	134°	31%	69%	25%	78%	Eton College
Fallow	#C19A6B	76%	60%	42%	33°	41%	59%	45%	76%	ISCC-NBS
Falu red	#801818	50%	9%	9%	0°	68%	30%	81%	50%	ColorHexa
Fandango	#B53389	71%	20%	54%	320°	56%	46%	72%	71%	Maerz and Paul
Fandango pink	#DE5285	87%	32%	52%	338°	68%	60%	63%	87%	Pantone
Fawn	#E5AA70	90%	67%	44%	30°	69%	67%	51%	90%	X11/Web
Fern green	#4F7942	31%	47%	26%	106°	29%	37%	45%	47%	Maerz and Paul
Field drab	#6C541E	42%	33%	12%	42°	57%	27%	72%	42%	ISCC-NBS
Fiery rose	#FF5470	100%	33%	44%	350°	100%	67%	67%	100%	Crayola
Finn	#683068	41%	19%	41%	300°	37%	30%	54%	41%	hexcolor.co
Firebrick	#B22222	70%	13%	13%	0°	68%	42%	81%	70%	X11/Web
Fire engine red	#CE2029	81%	13%	16%	357°	73%	47%	84%	81%	findthedata.com
Flame	#E25822	89%	35%	13%	17°	77%	51%	85%	89%	ISCC-NBS
Flax	#EEDC82	93%	86%	51%	50°	76%	72%	45%	93%	Maerz and Paul
Flirt	#A2006D	64%	0%	43%	320°	100%	32%	100%	64%	Xona.com
Floral white	#FFFAF0	100%	98%	94%	40°	100%	97%	6%	100%	X11/Web
Forest green (web)	#228B22	13%	55%	13%	120°	61%	34%	76%	55%	X11/Web
French beige	#A67B5B	65%	48%	36%	26°	30%	50%	45%	65%	ISCC-NBS
French bistre	#856D4D	52%	43%	30%	34°	27%	41%	42%	52%	Pourpre.com
French blue	#0072BB	0%	45%	73%	203°	100%	37%	100%	73%	Maerz and Paul
French fuchsia	#FD3F92	99%	25%	57%	334°	98%	62%	75%	99%	Pourpre.com
French lilac	#86608E	53%	38%	56%	290°	19%	47%	32%	56%	ISCC-NBS
French lime	#9EFD38	62%	99%	22%	89°	98%	61%	78%	99%	Pourpre.com
French mauve	#D473D4	83%	45%	83%	300°	53%	64%	46%	83%	Pourpre.com
French pink	#FD6C9E	99%	42%	62%	339°	97%	71%	57%	99%	Pourpre.com
French raspberry	#C72C48	78%	17%	28%	349°	64%	48%	78%	78%	Pourpre.com
French sky blue	#77B5FE	47%	71%	100%	212°	99%	73%	53%	100%	Pourpre.com
French violet	#8806CE	53%	2%	81%	279°	94%	42%	97%	81%	Pourpre.com
Frostbite	#E936A7	91%	21%	65%	322°	80%	56%	77%	91%	Crayola
Fuchsia	#FF00FF	100%	0%	100%	300°	100%	50%	100%	100%	X11/Web
Fuchsia (Crayola)	#C154C1	76%	33%	76%	300°	47%	54%	56%	76%	Crayola
Fulvous	#E48400	89%	52%	0%	35°	100%	45%	100%	89%	99colors.net
Fuzzy Wuzzy	#87421F	53%	26%	12%	20°	63%	33%	77%	53%	Crayola

== See also ==
- Basic Color Terms: Their Universality and Evolution (book)
- Color blindness
- Colors of the rainbow
- Eye color
- Index of color-related articles
- List of colors: G–M
- List of colors: N–Z
- List of color palettes
- List of colors (compact)
- List of Crayola crayon colors
- Pantone colors
- Pigment
- Primary color
- Secondary color
- Tertiary color
- Tincture (heraldry)
- X11 color names
- HSL and HSV
