= Shades of purple =

Variations of the color purple

Purple

Common connotations
- royalty, nobility, Lent, Easter, Mardi Gras, magic, Spirit Day

Color coordinates
- Hex triplet: #BF00FF
- sRGB^{B} (r, g, b): (191, 0, 255)
- HSV (h, s, v): (285°, 100%, 100%)
- CIELCh_{uv} (L, C, h): (50, 133, 288°)
- Source: Secondary color
- B: Normalized to [0–255] (byte)

There are numerous variations of the color purple, a sampling of which is shown below.

In common English usage, purple is a range of hues of color occurring between red and blue. However, the meaning of the term purple is not well defined. There is confusion about the meaning of the terms purple and violet even among native speakers of English. Many native speakers of English in the United States refer to the blue-dominated spectral color beyond blue as purple, but the same color is referred to as violet by many native English speakers in the United Kingdom. The full range of colors between red and blue is referred to by the term purple in some British authoritative texts, whereas the same range of colors is referred to by the term violet in some other texts. The confusion about the range of meanings of the terms violet and purple is even larger when including other languages and historical texts. Since this Wikipedia page contains contributions from authors from different countries and different native languages, this Wikipedia page is likely not to be consistent in the use of the color terms purple and violet.

In formal color theory, purple colors often refer to the colors on the line of purples on the CIE chromaticity diagram (or colors that can be derived from colors on the line of purples), i.e., any color between red and violet, not including either red or violet themselves.

The first recorded use of purple as a color name in English was in 975 AD. According to color theory, purple is considered a cool color.

== Historical development of purple ==
=== Tyrian purple: Classical antiquity ===
See also under Purple#In art, history and fashion the section "In prehistory and the ancient world: Tyrian purple"

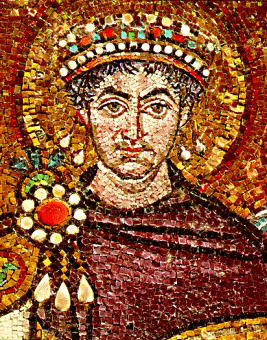
Byzantine Emperor Justinian I clad in Tyrian purple; 6th-century mosaic in the Basilica of San Vitale

Tyrian Purple

Color coordinates
- Hex triplet: #66023C
- sRGB^{B} (r, g, b): (102, 2, 60)
- HSV (h, s, v): (325°, 98%, 40%)
- CIELCh_{uv} (L, C, h): (21, 49, 346°)
- Source: Green-Lion.net
- ISCC–NBS descriptor: Very deep red
- B: Normalized to [0–255] (byte)

"Tyrian purple" is the contemporary English name of the color that in Latin is denominated "purpura". Other contemporary English names for purpura are "imperial purple" and "royal purple". The English name "purple" itself originally denominated the specific color purpura. Purpura is the color of a dye extracted from a mollusk found on the shores of the city of Tyre in ancient Phoenicia (contemporarily in Lebanon), which color in classical antiquity was a symbol of royalty and political authority because only the very wealthy could afford it, including the Roman Emperors. Therefore, Tyrian purple was also denominated "imperial purple".

Tyrian purple may have been discovered as early as during the Minoan civilization. Alexander the Great, when giving imperial audiences as the emperor of Macedonia; the emperor of the Seleucid Empire; and the kings of Ptolemaic Egypt all wore Tyrian purple. The imperial robes of Roman emperors were of Tyrian purple trimmed in metallic gold thread. The badge of office of a Roman Senator was a stripe of Tyrian purple on his white toga. Tyrian purple was continued in use by the emperors of the Eastern Roman Empire until its final collapse in 1453.

The tone of Tyrian purple displayed above is that tone of Tyrian purple which was the color of "clotted blood", which was considered the tone having the most prestige in ancient Greece and Rome, as recorded by Pliny the Elder. However, the actual tone varied depending on how the dye was formulated. Lesser royal houses that wanted to economize could mix Tyrian purple dye with the much less expensive indigo to create a color closer to violet.

=== Han purple: Ancient China ===
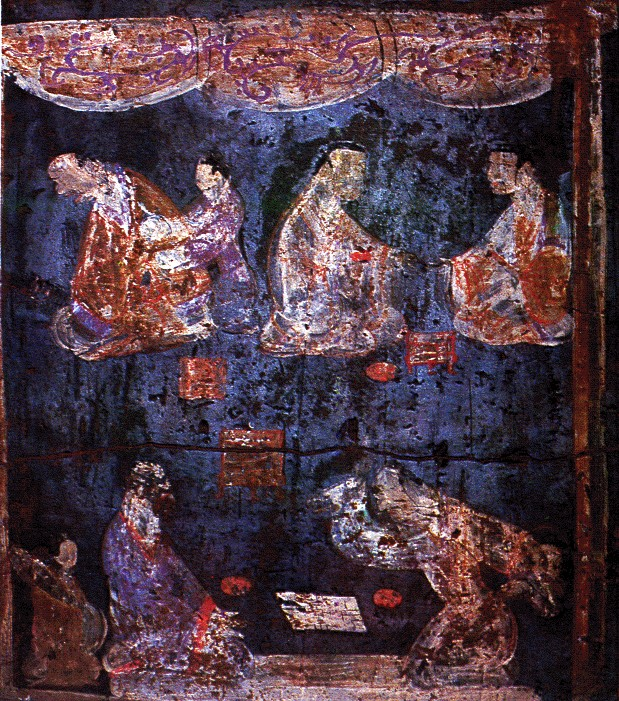
Han purple and Han blue were synthetic colors made by artisans in China during the Han dynasty (206 BC to 220 AD) or even earlier.

Han purple is a type of artificial pigment found in China between 500 BC and AD 220. It was used in the decoration of the Terracotta Army.

=== Royal purple: 17th century ===
Royal Purple

Color coordinates
- Hex triplet: #7851A9
- sRGB^{B} (r, g, b): (120, 81, 169)
- HSV (h, s, v): (267°, 52%, 66%)
- CIELCh_{uv} (L, C, h): (42, 65, 280°)
- Source: Crayola
- ISCC–NBS descriptor: Strong violet
- B: Normalized to [0–255] (byte)

The color royal purple is a tone of purple that is bluer than the ancient Tyrian purple.

The first recorded use of royal purple as a color name in English was in 1661.

In 1990, royal purple was formulated as one of the Crayola crayon colors.

=== Mauveine: 1860s–1890s ===
Mauveine
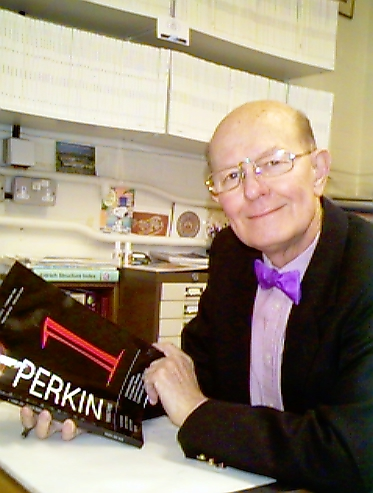
- Professor Charles Rees—wearing bow tie dyed with original sample of mauveine—holding RSC journal named after Perkin

Color coordinates
- Hex triplet: #8D029B
- sRGB^{B} (r, g, b): (141, 2, 155)
- HSV (h, s, v): (295°, 99%, 61%)
- CIELCh_{uv} (L, C, h): (34, 81, 301°)
- Source: Color-Name.com
- ISCC–NBS descriptor: Vivid purple
- B: Normalized to [0–255] (byte)

Mauveine was first named in 1856. Chemist Sir William Henry Perkin, then eighteen, was attempting to create artificial quinine. An unexpected residue caught his eye, which turned out to be the first aniline dye—specifically, Perkin's mauve or mauveine is sometimes called aniline purple. Perkin was so successful in recommending his discovery to the dyestuffs industry that his biography by Simon Garfield is titled Mauve. As mauveine faded easily, contemporary understanding of mauve is as a lighter, less saturated color than it was originally known.

"Mauveine" was named after the mauve colored mallow flower, even though it is a much deeper tone of purple than mauve. The term "Mauve" in the late 19th century could refer to either the deep, rich color of the dye or the light color of the flower. Mauve (meaning Mauveine) came into great vogue when in 1862 Queen Victoria appeared at the Royal Exhibition in a mauve silk gown—dyed with mauveine. By 1890, this color had become so pervasive in fashion that author Thomas Beer used it in the title of his book about the 1890s, The Mauve Decade.

=== Artists' pigment purple (red-violet): 1930s ===
Red-Violet

Color coordinates
- Hex triplet: #C71585
- sRGB^{B} (r, g, b): (199, 21, 133)
- HSV (h, s, v): (322°, 89%, 78%)
- CIELCh_{uv} (L, C, h): (45, 98, 340°)
- Source: X11 color names
- ISCC–NBS descriptor: Vivid purplish red
- B: Normalized to [0–255] (byte)

In some parts of the world, 'Royal purple' (shown above) or the dark violet color known as generic purple is the common layman's idea of purple, but these color terms carry different meanings in different parts of the world. Even among modern native speakers of English there is confusion about the terms purple and violet. In the United Kingdom, many native speakers of English refer to the blue-dominated spectral color beyond blue as violet, but this color is called purple by many speakers in the United States. In some texts the term violet refers to any color between red and blue. However, there are also authoritative texts from the United Kingdom in which this same range of colors is referred to by the term purple. When including languages other than English, and epochs other than the modern period, the uncertainty about the meanings of the color terms violet and purple is even larger. Since this Wikipedia page contains contributions from authors from different countries and different native languages, it is likely to be not consistent in the use of the color terms violet and purple.

Artists that happen to follow Munsell color system (introduced in 1905 and used since 1930 by a large number of artists in the United States, but by much fewer artists outside the US), may regard purple as being synonymous with the red-violet color, represented by the web color medium violet red. Munsell included purple as a color hue in his color system, but he did not do so for violet as he did not need it as a label for his system (just like the hue term orange is not used in Munsell's system). If defined as blue-dominated colors between blue and red, violet colors in Munsell's system would be classified as having the 7.5PB and 10.0PB hue, which is confirmed in visual experiments The truly purple color, defined as being within the range of the red-dominated colors between red and blue, is sometimes confusingly labeled as red-violet color, or more correctly artist's purple. It is the pigment color that would be on a pigment color color wheel between pigment violet and pigment (process) magenta. In the Munsell color system, this color at its maximum chroma of 12 is called Red-Purple, or more specifically Munsell 5RP.

Artists' pigments and colored pencils labeled as purple are typically colored the red-violet color. On an RYB color wheel, the so-called red-violet color is the color between red and violet.

=== Electric purple: 2000s ===
Electric Purple

Color coordinates
- Hex triplet: #BF00FF
- sRGB^{B} (r, g, b): (191, 0, 255)
- HSV (h, s, v): (285°, 100%, 100%)
- CIELCh_{uv} (L, C, h): (50, 133, 288°)
- Source: X11 color names
- ISCC–NBS descriptor: Vivid purple
- B: Normalized to [0–255] (byte)

This color, electric purple, is precisely halfway between violet and magenta and thus fits the artistic definition of purple.

Using additive colors such as those on computer screens, it is possible to create a much brighter purple than with pigments where the mixing subtracts frequencies from the component primary colors. The equivalent color on a computer to the pigment color red-violet shown above would be this electric purple, i.e. the much brighter purple reproduced on the screen of a computer. This color is pure purple conceived as computer artists conceive it, as the color on the color wheel halfway between color wheel violet and electric magenta. Thus, electric purple is the purest and brightest purple that it is possible to display on a computer screen. Its RGB code is (191, 0, 255).

An old name for this color, used by Robert Ridgway in his 1912 book on color nomenclature, Color Standards and Color Nomenclature, is true purple.

== Web colors ==
=== Purple (HTML/CSS color) (patriarch) ===
Purple (HTML/CSS color)

Color coordinates
- Hex triplet: #800080
- sRGB^{B} (r, g, b): (128, 0, 128)
- HSV (h, s, v): (300°, 100%, 50%)
- CIELCh_{uv} (L, C, h): (30, 68, 308°)
- Source: HTML/CSS
- ISCC–NBS descriptor: Deep purple
- B: Normalized to [0–255] (byte)

This purple used in HTML and CSS actually is deeper and has a more reddish hue (#800080) than the X11 color purple shown below as purple (X11 color) (#A020F0), which is bluer and brighter. This is one of the very few clashes between web and X11 colors.

This color may be called HTML/CSS purple. It seems likely that this color was chosen as the web color purple because its hue is exactly halfway between red and blue and its value is exactly halfway between white and black.

A traditional name sometimes used for this tone of purple is patriarch. The first recorded use of patriarch as a color name in English was in 1925.

=== Purple (X11 color) (veronica) ===
Purple (X11 color)

Color coordinates
- Hex triplet: #A020F0
- sRGB^{B} (r, g, b): (160, 32, 240)
- HSV (h, s, v): (277°, 87%, 94%)
- CIELCh_{uv} (L, C, h): (45, 123, 283°)
- Source: X11
- ISCC–NBS descriptor: Vivid violet
- B: Normalized to [0–255] (byte)

The color purple, as defined in the X11 color names in 1987, is brighter and bluer than the HTML/CSS web color purple shown above as purple (HTML/CSS color). This is one of the very few clashes between web and X11 colors.

This color can be called X11 purple.

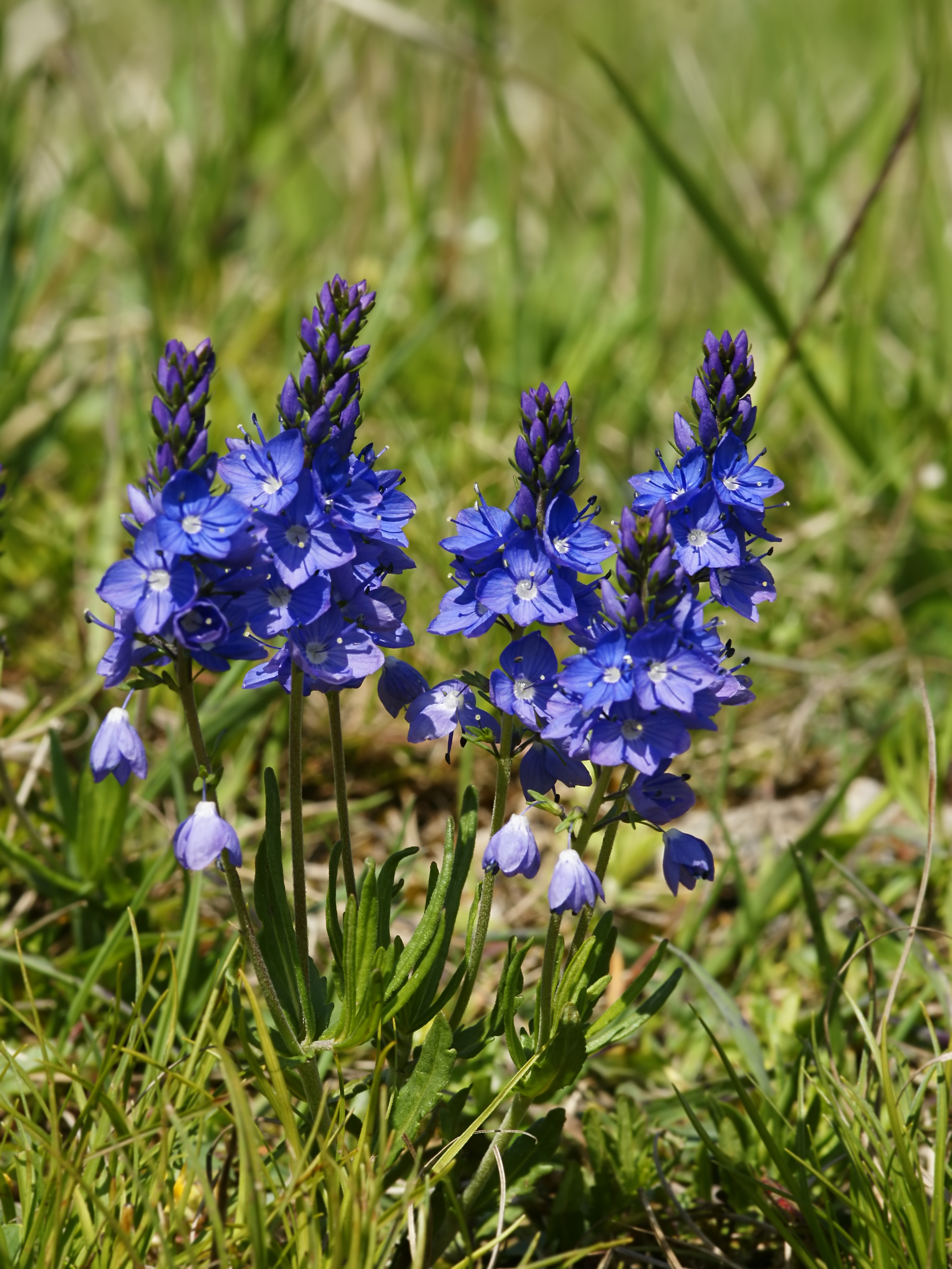
Veronica prostrata, for which the color veronica is named

The traditional name for this tone of purple is veronica. The first recorded use of veronica as a color name in English was in 1919.

=== Medium purple (X11) ===
Medium Purple

Color coordinates
- Hex triplet: #9370DB
- sRGB^{B} (r, g, b): (147, 112, 219)
- HSV (h, s, v): (260°, 49%, 86%)
- CIELCh_{uv} (L, C, h): (55, 83, 276°)
- Source: X11 color names
- ISCC–NBS descriptor: Vivid violet
- B: Normalized to [0–255] (byte)

The web color medium purple is a medium shade of the bright X11 purple shown above.

=== Rebecca purple ===
Rebecca purple

Color coordinates
- Hex triplet: #663399
- sRGB^{B} (r, g, b): (102, 51, 153)
- HSV (h, s, v): (270°, 67%, 60%)
- CIELCh_{uv} (L, C, h): (33, 69, 281°)
- Source: CSS 4.1
- B: Normalized to [0–255] (byte)

Rebecca purple was named after the daughter of CSS pioneer Eric A. Meyer and added to CSS 4.1.

== Additional definitions of purple ==
=== Purple (Encycolorpedia) ===
Purple

Color coordinates
- Hex triplet: #6A0DAD
- sRGB^{B} (r, g, b): (106, 13, 173)
- HSV (h, s, v): (275°, 92%, 68%)
- CIELCh_{uv} (L, C, h): (30, 88, 280°)
- Source: Encycolorpedia
- ISCC–NBS descriptor: Vivid violet
- B: Normalized to [0–255] (byte)

This shade of purple is used on Encycolorpedia.

=== Purple (Munsell) ===
Purple (Munsell)
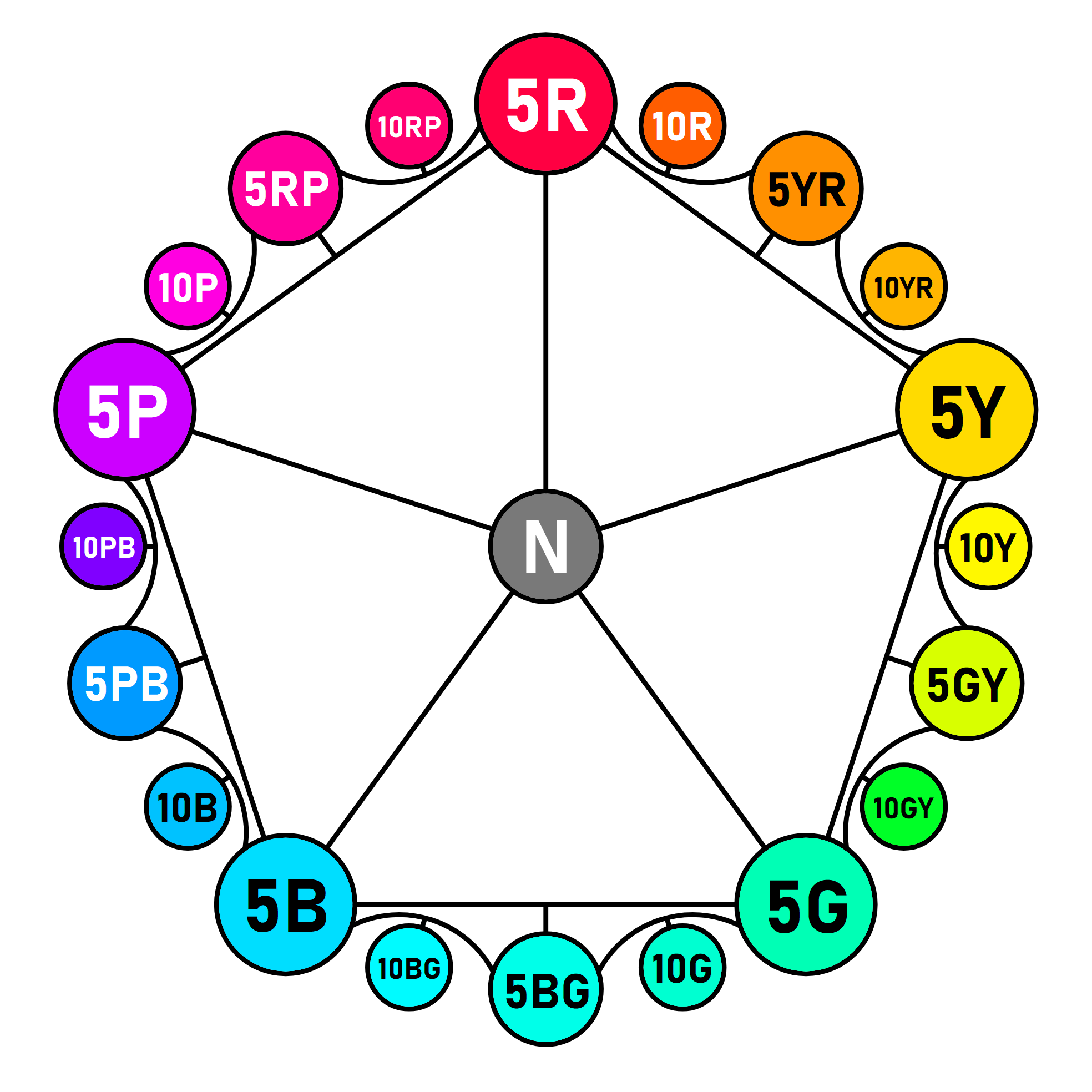
- The hues of the Munsell color system, at varying values, and maximum chroma to stay in the sRGB gamut

Color coordinates
- Hex triplet: #CC00FF
- sRGB^{B} (r, g, b): (204, 0, 255)
- HSV (h, s, v): (288°, 100%, 100%)
- CIELCh_{uv} (L, C, h): (52, 133, 292°)
- Source: https://pteromys.melonisland.net/munsell/
- ISCC–NBS descriptor: Vivid purple
- B: Normalized to [0–255] (byte)

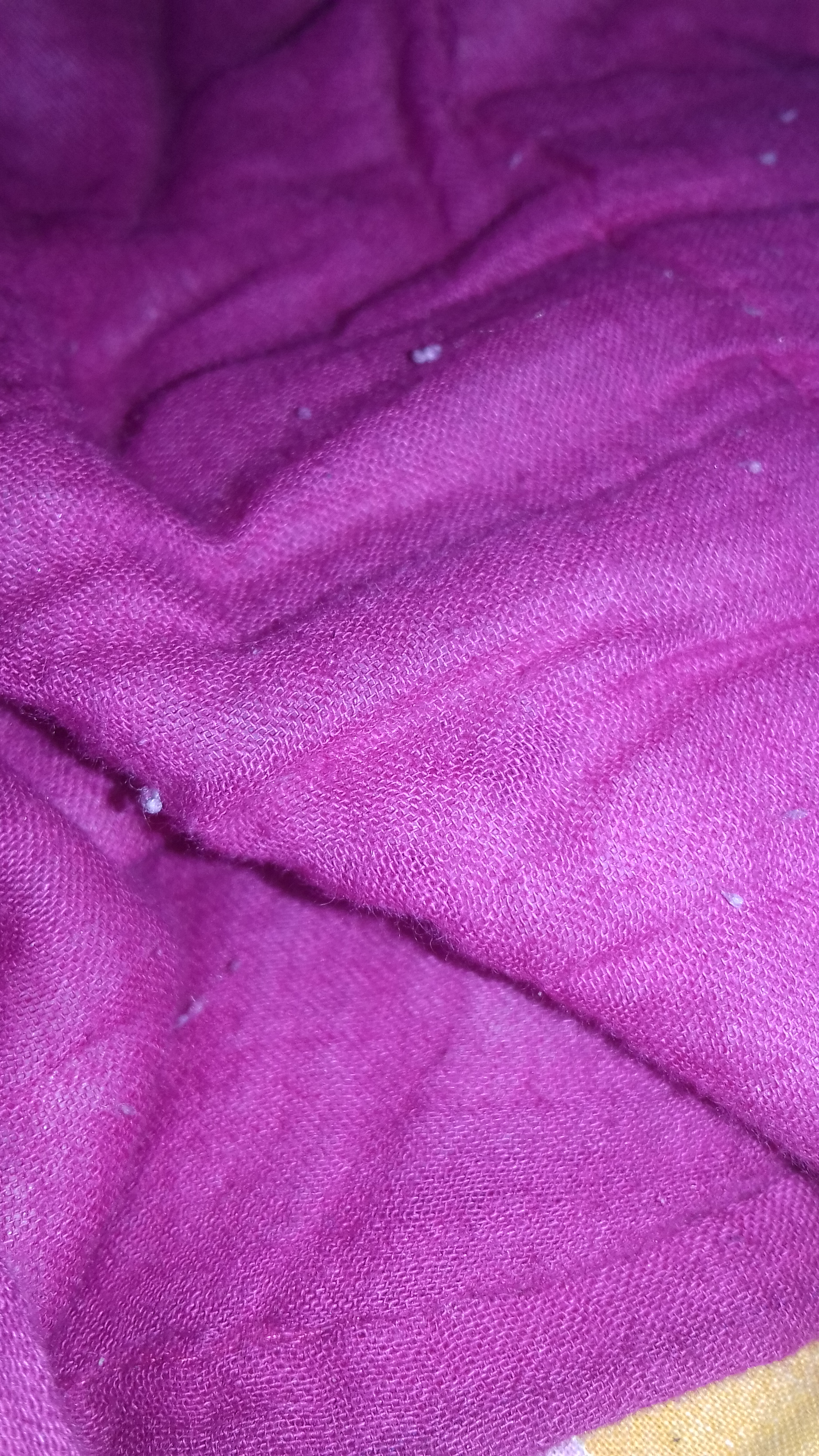
The hue of the color of this cloth is close to 5P in the Munsell color space

The Munsell color system is a color space that specifies colors based on three color dimensions: hue, value (lightness), and chroma (colorfulness), spaced uniformly (in terms of human perception) in three dimensions in the Munsell color solid. In order for all the colors to be spaced uniformly, it was found necessary to use a color wheel with five, non-arbitrary, equally spaced primary colors: red, yellow, green, blue, and purple.

The color of the sample is the most chromatic (colorful) purple in the sRGB gamut that falls in the hue of 5P (primary purple) in the Munsell color space.

== Additional variations ==
=== Byzantium ===
Byzantium

Color coordinates
- Hex triplet: #702963
- sRGB^{B} (r, g, b): (112, 41, 99)
- HSV (h, s, v): (311°, 63%, 44%)
- CIELCh_{uv} (L, C, h): (29, 44, 319°)
- Source: ISCC-NBS
- ISCC–NBS descriptor: Deep reddish purple
- B: Normalized to [0–255] (byte)

The color Byzantium is a dark tone of purple.

The first recorded use of byzantium as a color name in English was in 1926.

=== Dark purple ===
Dark Purple

Color coordinates
- Hex triplet: #301934
- sRGB^{B} (r, g, b): (48, 25, 52)
- HSV (h, s, v): (291°, 52%, 20%)
- CIELCh_{uv} (L, C, h): (13, 15, 300°)
- Source: ISCC-NBS
- ISCC–NBS descriptor: Very dark purple
- B: Normalized to [0–255] (byte)

Dark purple is the dark tone of purple.

=== Eminence ===
Eminence

Color coordinates
- Hex triplet: #6C3082
- sRGB^{B} (r, g, b): (108, 48, 130)
- HSV (h, s, v): (284°, 63%, 51%)
- CIELCh_{uv} (L, C, h): (32, 55, 293°)
- Source: Xona.com Color List
- ISCC–NBS descriptor: Deep purple
- B: Normalized to [0–255] (byte)

The color name eminence, used since the 1800s, has been in modern use for this color since 2001 when the Xona.com Color List was first promulgated.

=== Heliotrope ===
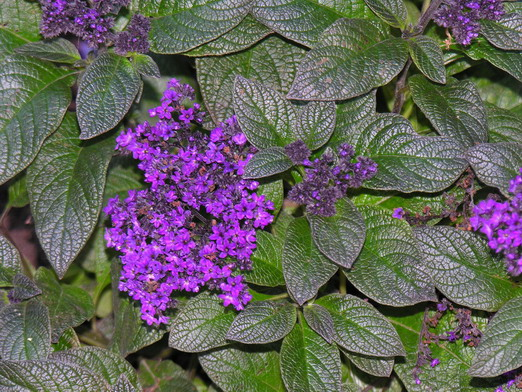
Heliotropium peruvianum

Heliotrope

Color coordinates
- Hex triplet: #DF73FF
- sRGB^{B} (r, g, b): (223, 115, 255)
- HSV (h, s, v): (286°, 55%, 100%)
- CIELCh_{uv} (L, C, h): (66, 102, 295°)
- Source: Maerz and Paul
- ISCC–NBS descriptor: Vivid purple
- B: Normalized to [0–255] (byte)

The color heliotrope is a brilliant tone of purple; it is a pink-purple tint that is a representation of the color of the heliotrope flower.

The first recorded use of heliotrope as a color name in English was in 1882.

=== KSU Purple ===
KSU Purple

Color coordinates
- Hex triplet: #512888
- sRGB^{B} (r, g, b): (81, 40, 136)
- HSV (h, s, v): (266°, 71%, 53%)
- CIELCh_{uv} (L, C, h): (27, 62, 277°)
- Source: KSU Brand Guide
- ISCC–NBS descriptor: Deep violet
- B: Normalized to [0–255] (byte)

For printed material, purple (Pantone #268+) is the official school color of Kansas State University. Traditionally, the school has referred to this darker and bluer shade as Royal Purple. [compare with Royal purple: 17th century]

For the web, #512888 is the official color, even though that hex triplet is not a direct conversion from Pantone 268+.

=== Lavender ===
Lavender
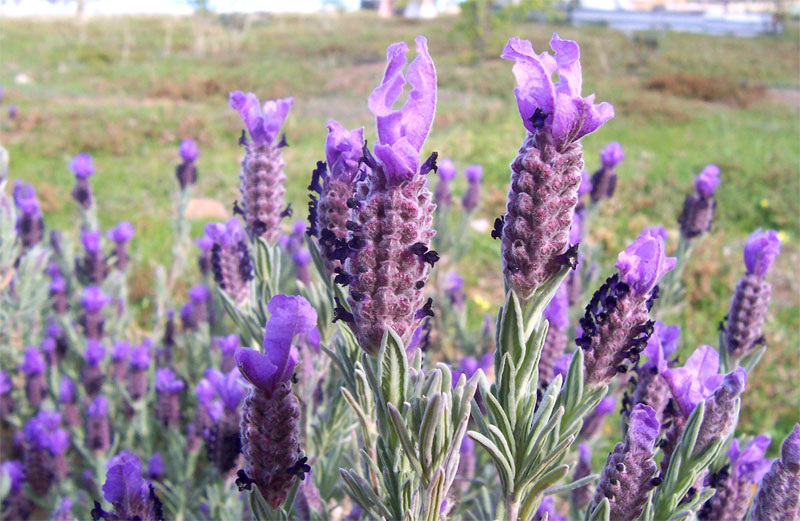
- Lavender flowers

Color coordinates
- Hex triplet: #B57EDC
- sRGB^{B} (r, g, b): (181, 126, 220)
- HSV (h, s, v): (275°, 43%, 86%)
- CIELCh_{uv} (L, C, h): (62, 71, 287°)
- Source: Maerz and Paul
- ISCC–NBS descriptor: Strong purple
- B: Normalized to [0–255] (byte)

At right is displayed the color lavender. This color may also be called lavender (floral) or floral lavender to distinguish it from the web color lavender. It is the color of the central part of the lavender flower.

The first recorded use of the word lavender as a color term in English was in 1705.

Since the color lavender has a hue code of 275, it may be regarded as a light tone of purple.

=== Liseran purple ===
Liseran Purple

Color coordinates
- Hex triplet: #DE6FA1
- sRGB^{B} (r, g, b): (222, 111, 161)
- HSV (h, s, v): (333°, 50%, 87%)
- CIELCh_{uv} (L, C, h): (61, 71, 345°)
- Source: ISCC-NBS
- ISCC–NBS descriptor: Deep purplish pink
- B: Normalized to [0–255] (byte)

The first recorded use of liseran purple as a color name in English was in 1912.

=== Mardi Gras ===
Mardi Gras

Color coordinates
- Hex triplet: #880085
- sRGB^{B} (r, g, b): (136, 0, 133)
- HSV (h, s, v): (301°, 100%, 53%)
- CIELCh_{uv} (L, C, h): (32, 72, 309°)
- Source: Xona.com Color List
- ISCC–NBS descriptor: Vivid reddish purple
- B: Normalized to [0–255] (byte)

The color name Mardi Gras has been in use since 2001 when the Xona.com Color List was first promulgated.

=== Mauve ===
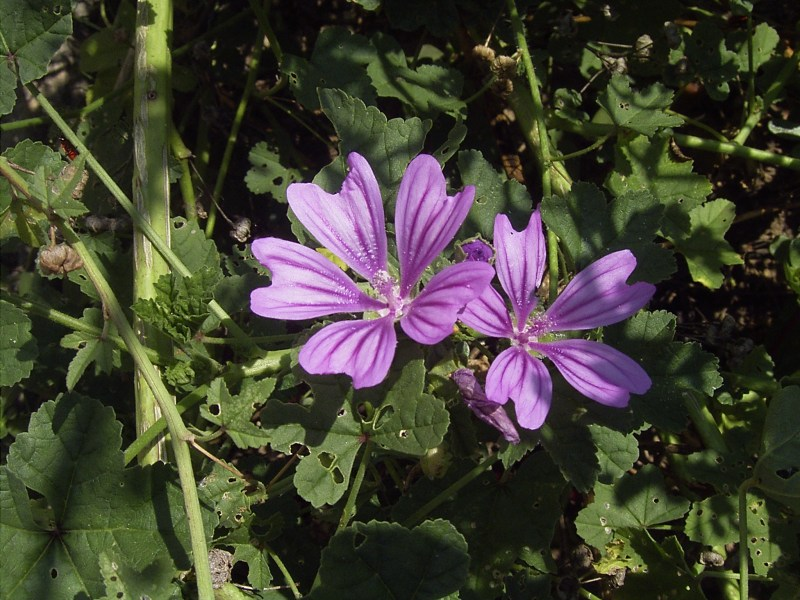
Mallow wildflower

Mauve (Mallow)

Color coordinates
- Hex triplet: #E0B0FF
- sRGB^{B} (r, g, b): (224, 176, 255)
- HSV (h, s, v): (276°, 31%, 100%)
- CIELCh_{uv} (L, C, h): (79, 61, 290°)
- Source: Maerz and Paul
- ISCC–NBS descriptor: Brilliant purple
- B: Normalized to [0–255] (byte)

Mauve /ˈmoʊv/ (rhymes with "grove"; from the French form of Malva "mallow") is a pale purple. Mauve is named after the mallow flower. Another name for the color is mallow with the first recorded use of mallow as a color name in English in 1611.

=== Mulberry ===
Mulberry

Color coordinates
- Hex triplet: #C54B8C
- sRGB^{B} (r, g, b): (197, 75, 140)
- HSV (h, s, v): (328°, 62%, 77%)
- CIELCh_{uv} (L, C, h): (50, 77, 341°)
- Source: Crayola
- ISCC–NBS descriptor: Strong purplish red
- B: Normalized to [0–255] (byte)

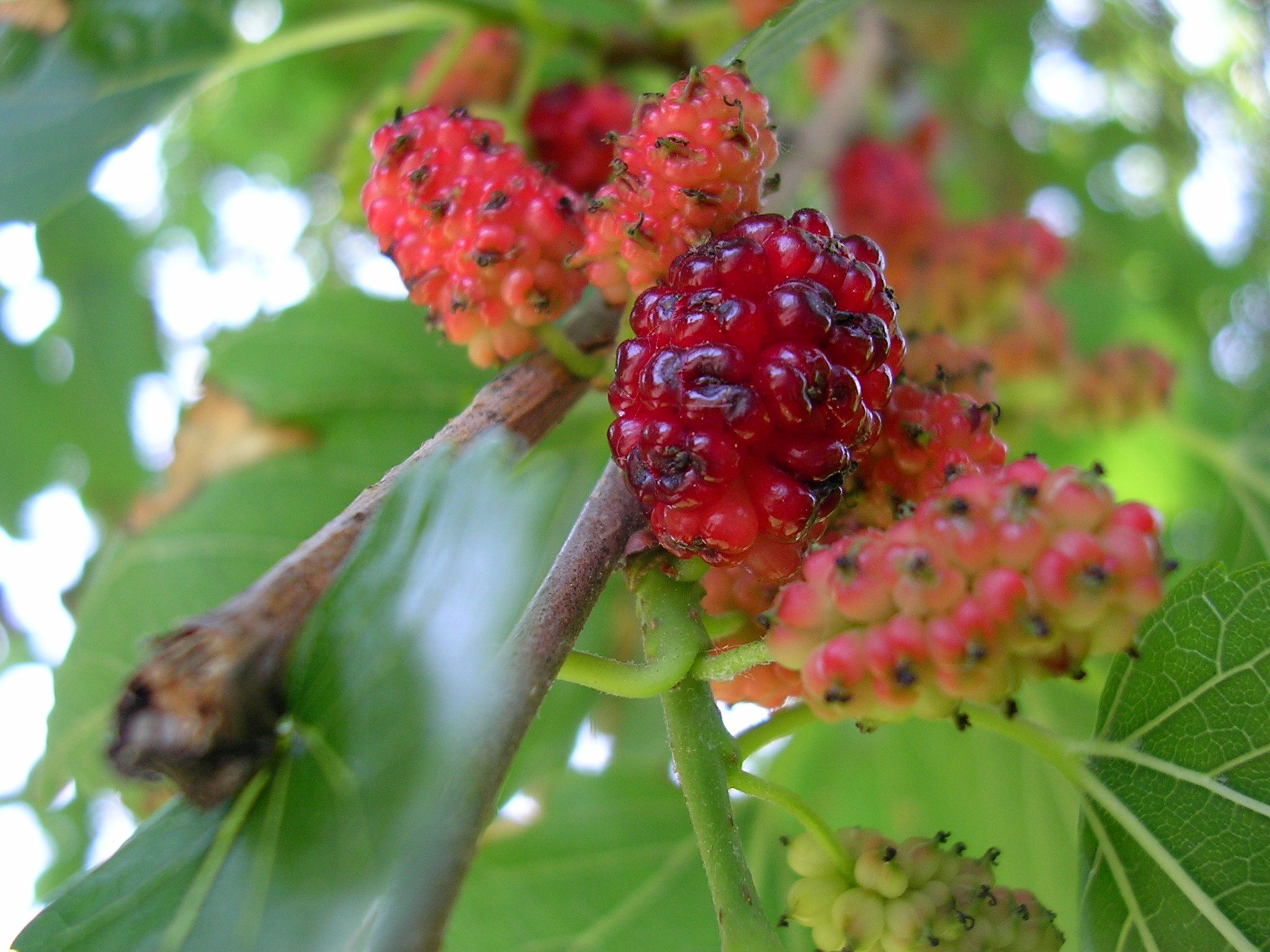
Mulberry fruits

The color mulberry is a representation of the color of mulberry jam or pie. This was a Crayola crayon color from 1958 to 2003.

The first recorded use of mulberry as a color name in English was in 1776.

=== Northwestern Purple ===
Northwestern Purple

Color coordinates
- Hex triplet: #4E2A84
- sRGB^{B} (r, g, b): (78, 42, 132)
- HSV (h, s, v): (264°, 68%, 52%)
- CIELCh_{uv} (L, C, h): (27, 59, 277°)
- Source: Northwestern University Brand Guide
- ISCC–NBS descriptor: Deep violet
- B: Normalized to [0–255] (byte)

Northwestern Purple is the official color of Northwestern University. Additionally, there are shades and tints that are variations of the base color. Northwestern Purple is a custom ink color and can no longer be referenced by a Pantone number.

=== Orchid ===
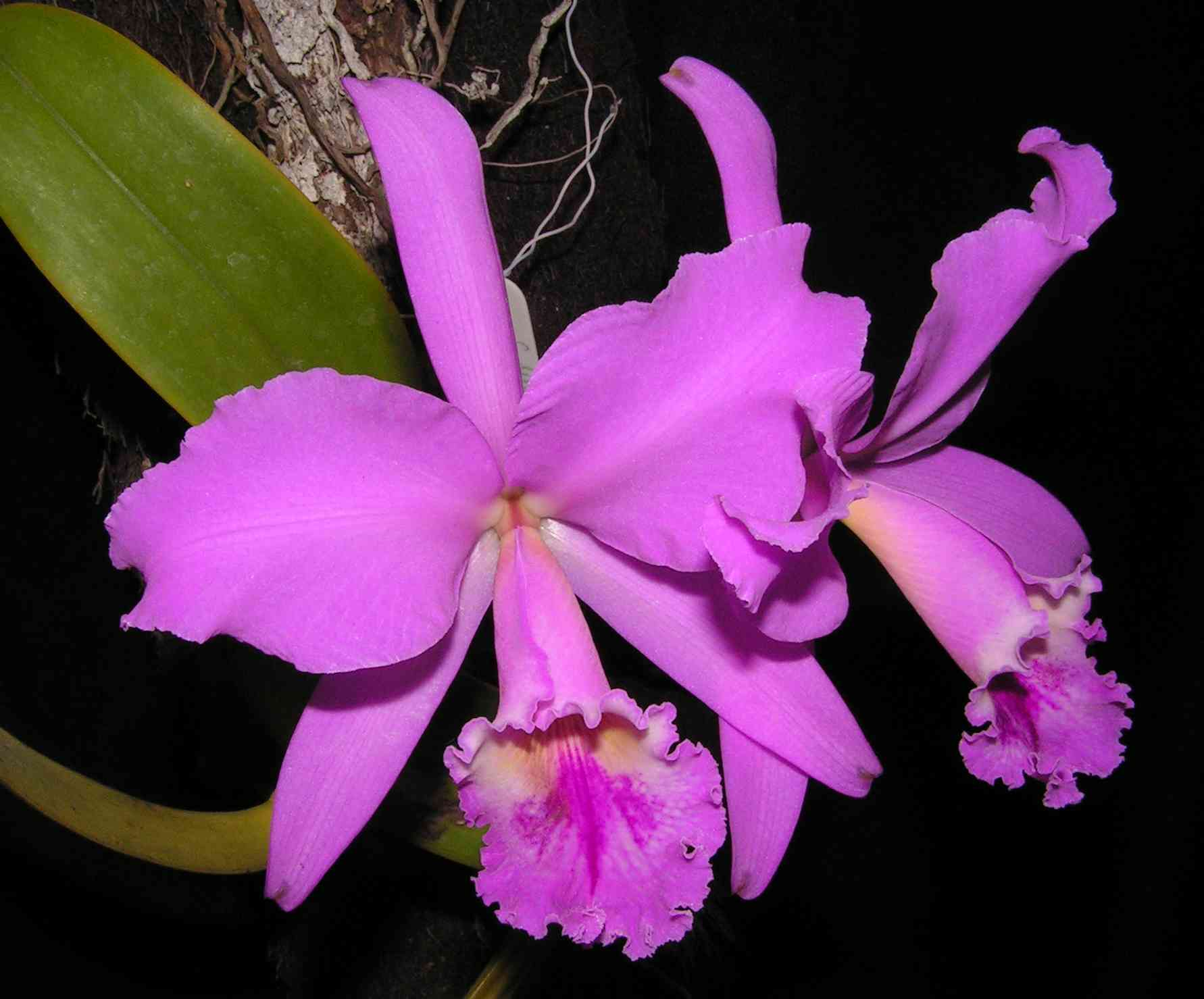
Cattleya labiata

Orchid

Color coordinates
- Hex triplet: #DA70D6
- sRGB^{B} (r, g, b): (218, 112, 214)
- HSV (h, s, v): (302°, 49%, 85%)
- CIELCh_{uv} (L, C, h): (63, 80, 310°)
- Source: X11 color names
- ISCC–NBS descriptor: Vivid purple
- B: Normalized to [0–255] (byte)

The color orchid is a bright rich purple. The name 'orchid' originates from the flowers of some species of the vast orchid flower family, such as Laelia furfuracea and Ascocentrum pusillum, which have petals of this color.

The first recorded use of orchid as a color name in English was in 1915.

=== Palatinate ===
Palatinate

Color coordinates
- Hex triplet: #72246C
- sRGB^{B} (r, g, b): (114, 36, 108)
- HSV (h, s, v): (305°, 68%, 45%)
- CIELCh_{uv} (L, C, h): (29, 50, 312°)
- Source: Durham University
- ISCC–NBS descriptor: Deep reddish purple
- B: Normalized to [0–255] (byte)

Palatinate is a color (a pale shade of violet) associated with the University of Durham (and with Newcastle University Medical School, this being the former medical school of Durham University.) A separate color, 'Palatinate Blue', is derived from the coat of arms of County Durham. The name 'Palatinate' in both instances alludes to the historic status of Durham as a County Palatine.

=== Pale purple ===
Pale Purple

Color coordinates
- Hex triplet: #FAE6FA
- sRGB^{B} (r, g, b): (250, 230, 250)
- HSV (h, s, v): (300°, 8%, 98%)
- CIELCh_{uv} (L, C, h): (93, 17, 308°)
- Source: Pantone TPX
- ISCC–NBS descriptor: Pale purplish pink
- B: Normalized to [0–255] (byte)

Pale purple is the pale tint of purple.

=== Pansy purple ===
Pansy Purple

Color coordinates
- Hex triplet: #78184A
- sRGB^{B} (r, g, b): (120, 24, 74)
- HSV (h, s, v): (329°, 80%, 47%)
- CIELCh_{uv} (L, C, h): (27, 54, 346°)
- Source: ISCC-NBS
- ISCC–NBS descriptor: Deep purplish red
- B: Normalized to [0–255] (byte)

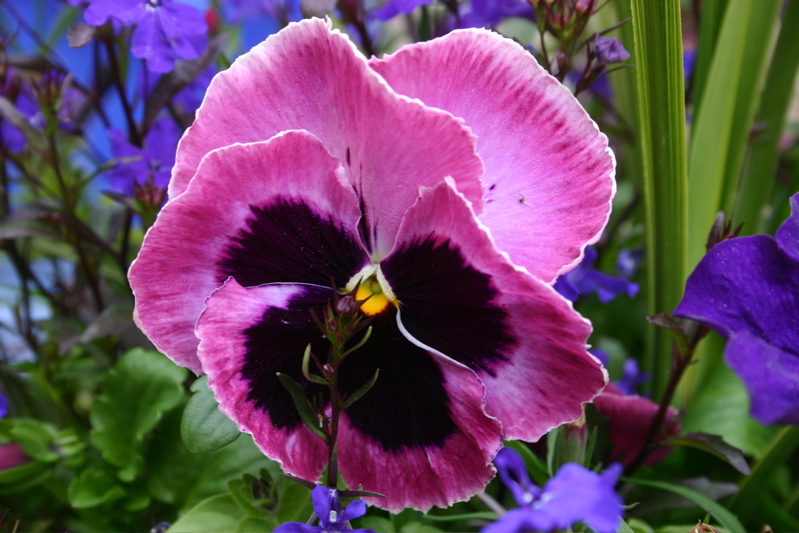
Purple Pansy

The pansy flower has varieties that exhibit three different colors: pansy (a color between indigo and violet), pansy pink, and pansy purple.

The first recorded use of pansy purple as a color name in English was in 1814.

=== Pearly purple ===
Pearly Purple

Color coordinates
- Hex triplet: #B768A2
- sRGB^{B} (r, g, b): (183, 104, 162)
- HSV (h, s, v): (316°, 43%, 72%)
- CIELCh_{uv} (L, C, h): (55, 54, 323°)
- Source: Crayola
- ISCC–NBS descriptor: Strong reddish purple
- B: Normalized to [0–255] (byte)

Pearly purple is one of the colors in the special set of metallic colored Crayola crayons called Silver Swirls, the colors of which were formulated by Crayola in 1990.

=== Pomp and Power ===
Pomp and Power

Color coordinates
- Hex triplet: #86608E
- sRGB^{B} (r, g, b): (134, 96, 142)
- HSV (h, s, v): (290°, 32%, 56%)
- CIELCh_{uv} (L, C, h): (46, 36, 300°)
- Source: ISCC-NBS
- ISCC–NBS descriptor: Moderate purple
- B: Normalized to [0–255] (byte)

The color pomp and power is not found in the 1930 first edition of the Dictionary of Color by Maerz and Paul, but it is found in the second edition of 1950.

The normalized color coordinates for pomp and power are identical to French lilac, first recorded as a color name in English in 1814.

=== Psychedelic purple (phlox) ===
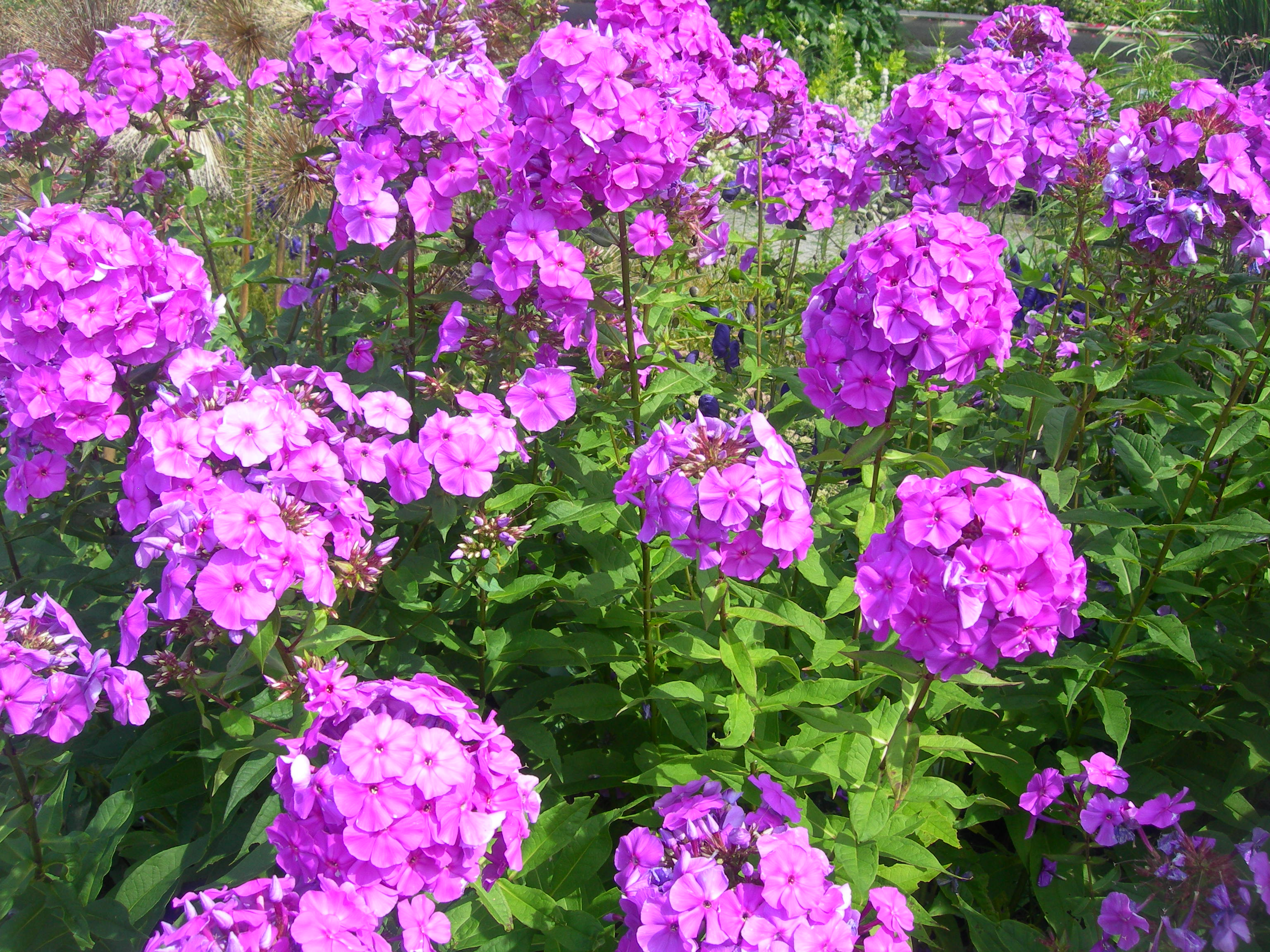
Garden Phlox (Phlox paniculata)

Psychedelic Purple (Phlox)

Color coordinates
- Hex triplet: #DF00FF
- sRGB^{B} (r, g, b): (223, 0, 255)
- HSV (h, s, v): (292°, 100%, 100%)
- CIELCh_{uv} (L, C, h): (55, 134, 298°)
- Source: Maerz and Paul
- ISCC–NBS descriptor: Vivid purple
- B: Normalized to [0–255] (byte)

The pure essence of purple was approximated in pigment in the late 1960s by mixing fluorescent magenta and fluorescent blue pigments together to make fluorescent purple to use in psychedelic black light paintings. This tone of purple was very popular among hippies and was the favorite color of Jimi Hendrix. Thus it is called psychedelic purple. Psychedelic purple is the color halfway between electric purple and magenta.

In the 1980s, there was a Jimi Hendrix Museum in a Victorian house on the east side of Central Avenue one half block south of Haight Street in the Haight-Ashbury neighborhood of San Francisco which was painted this color.

Another name for this color is phlox, as it is the color of the phlox flower. The first recorded use of phlox as a color name in English was in 1918.

=== Purple pizzazz ===
Purple Pizzazz

Color coordinates
- Hex triplet: #FE4EDA
- sRGB^{B} (r, g, b): (254, 78, 218)
- HSV (h, s, v): (312°, 69%, 100%)
- CIELCh_{uv} (L, C, h): (63, 111, 322°)
- Source: Crayola
- ISCC–NBS descriptor: Vivid reddish purple
- B: Normalized to [0–255] (byte)

The color purple pizzazz was formulated by Crayola in 1990.

=== Purpureus ===
Purpureus

Color coordinates
- Hex triplet: #9A4EAE
- sRGB^{B} (r, g, b): (154, 78, 174)
- HSV (h, s, v): (288°, 55%, 68%)
- CIELCh_{uv} (L, C, h): (46, 70, 297°)
- Source: ISCC-NBS
- ISCC–NBS descriptor: Vivid purple
- B: Normalized to [0–255] (byte)

This color is named purpureus. Another name for this color is purpura.

The first recorded use its alternative name purpura as a color name in English was in 1382.

=== Thistle ===
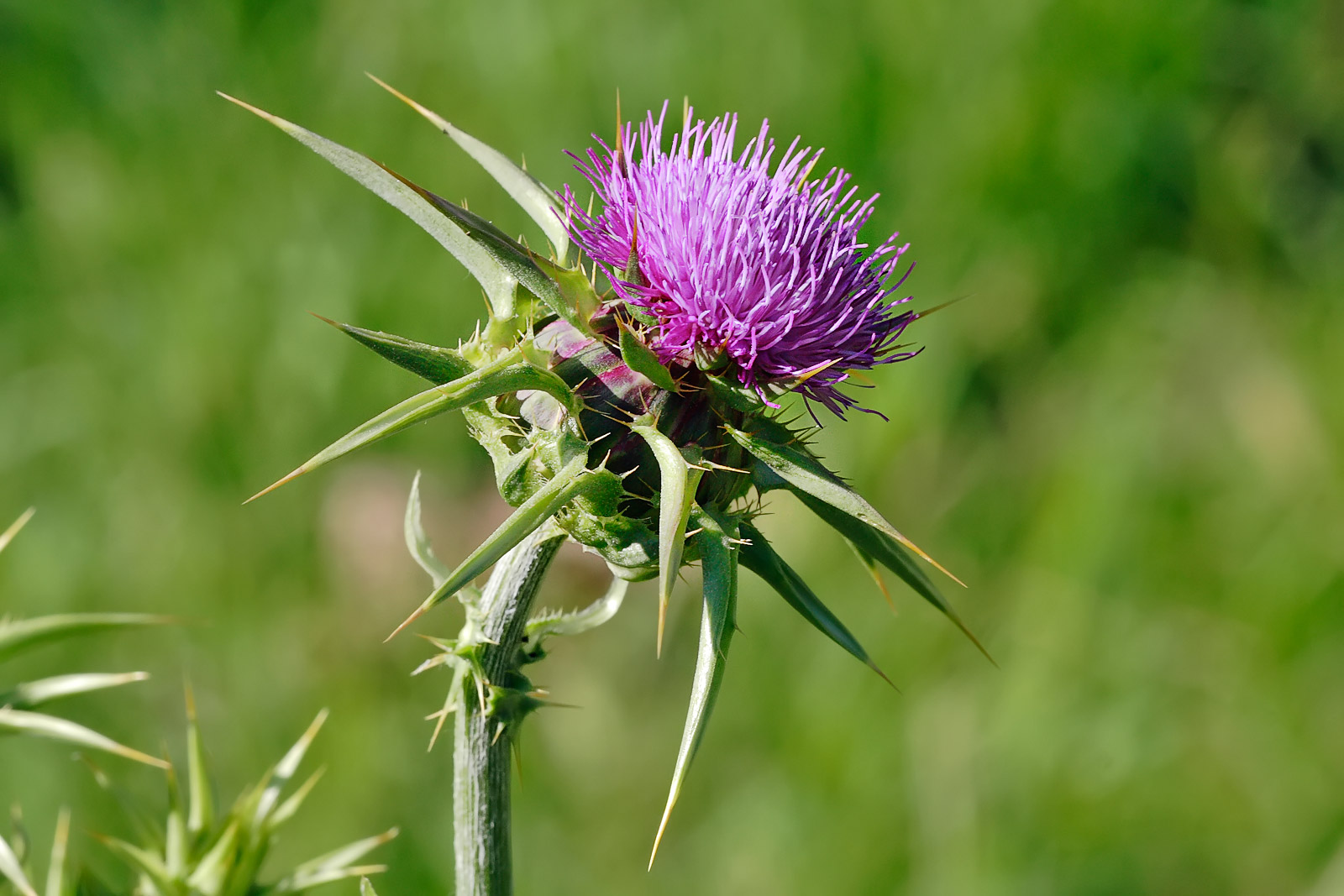
Milk thistle flowerhead

Thistle

Color coordinates
- Hex triplet: #D8BFD8
- sRGB^{B} (r, g, b): (216, 191, 216)
- HSV (h, s, v): (300°, 12%, 85%)
- CIELCh_{uv} (L, C, h): (80, 21, 308°)
- Source: X11 color names
- ISCC–NBS descriptor: Very pale purple
- B: Normalized to [0–255] (byte)

Thistle is a light purple resembling the thistle plant.

The first recorded use of Thistle as a color name in English was in 1892.

The color thistle is associated with Scotland because the thistle is the national flower of Scotland and Scotland's highest state decoration is the Order of the Thistle.

=== Vibrant purple ===
Vibrant Purple

Color coordinates
- Hex triplet: #AA00FF
- sRGB^{B} (r, g, b): (170, 0, 255)
- HSV (h, s, v): (280°, 100%, 100%)
- CIELCh_{uv} (L, C, h): (47, 134, 283°)
- Source: Color-Name.com
- ISCC–NBS descriptor: Vivid violet
- B: Normalized to [0–255] (byte)

This variant of purple is used on Color-Name.com, where it is one third of the way between violet and magenta with a hue of 280 degrees.

== See also ==
- Crimson
- Indigo
- Lists of colors
- Magenta
- Rose (color)
- Ultramarine
- Violet (color)
- Shades of violet
