= Android green =

Shade of chartreuse

Color coordinates
- Hex triplet: #3DDC84
- sRGB^{B} (r, g, b): (61, 220, 132)
- HSV (h, s, v): (147°, 72%, 86%)
- CIELCh_{uv} (L, C, h): (78, 82, 140°)
- Source: Google
- ISCC–NBS descriptor: Vivid yellowish green
- B: Normalized to [0–255] (byte)

Android green is a shade of chartreuse or Caribbean green, defined by Google as the color of the Android robot mascot, used as a logo for the Android operating system. It is defined to be RGB hex value #3DDC84 online and PMS 2412 C in print.

== Rebrand ==
The current color definition has been in place since a change in brand guidelines on Aug 22, 2019. Part of this change included the color of the android robot logo and therefore a change to the definition of android green. The color was changed to be more accessible to the colorblind, citing that "...green isn’t exactly an optimal color for a global brand. The most common form of colorblindness is red-green colorblindness, which can make certain shades of green hard to see."

== Original definition ==
Android green (pre-2018)

Color coordinates
- Hex triplet: #A4C639
- sRGB^{B} (r, g, b): (164, 198, 57)
- HSV (h, s, v): (74°, 71%, 78%)
- CIELCh_{uv} (L, C, h): (75, 79, 102°)
- Source: Google
- ISCC–NBS descriptor: Vivid yellow green
- B: Normalized to [0–255] (byte)

The prior definition of android green was a yellow-green color #A4C639 (PMS 376C in print). During the initial creation of the Android logo, first released on November 5, 2007, #A4C639 was selected by the original designer of the android logo, Irina Blok, "...because it reminded (us of a) nostalgic code color, and it would stand out against dark background." Code color probably refers to the color of text in Monochrome monitors, derived from the green "P1" phosphor.
