= Bronze (color) =

Metallic brown resembling the alloy bronze

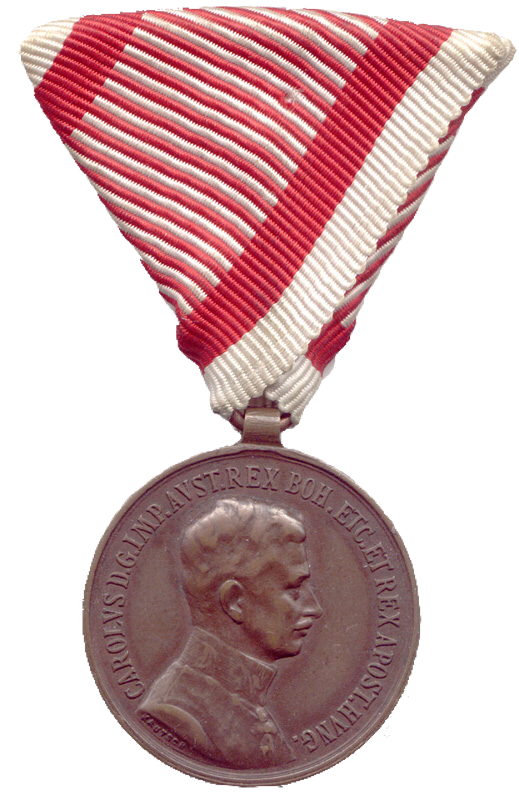
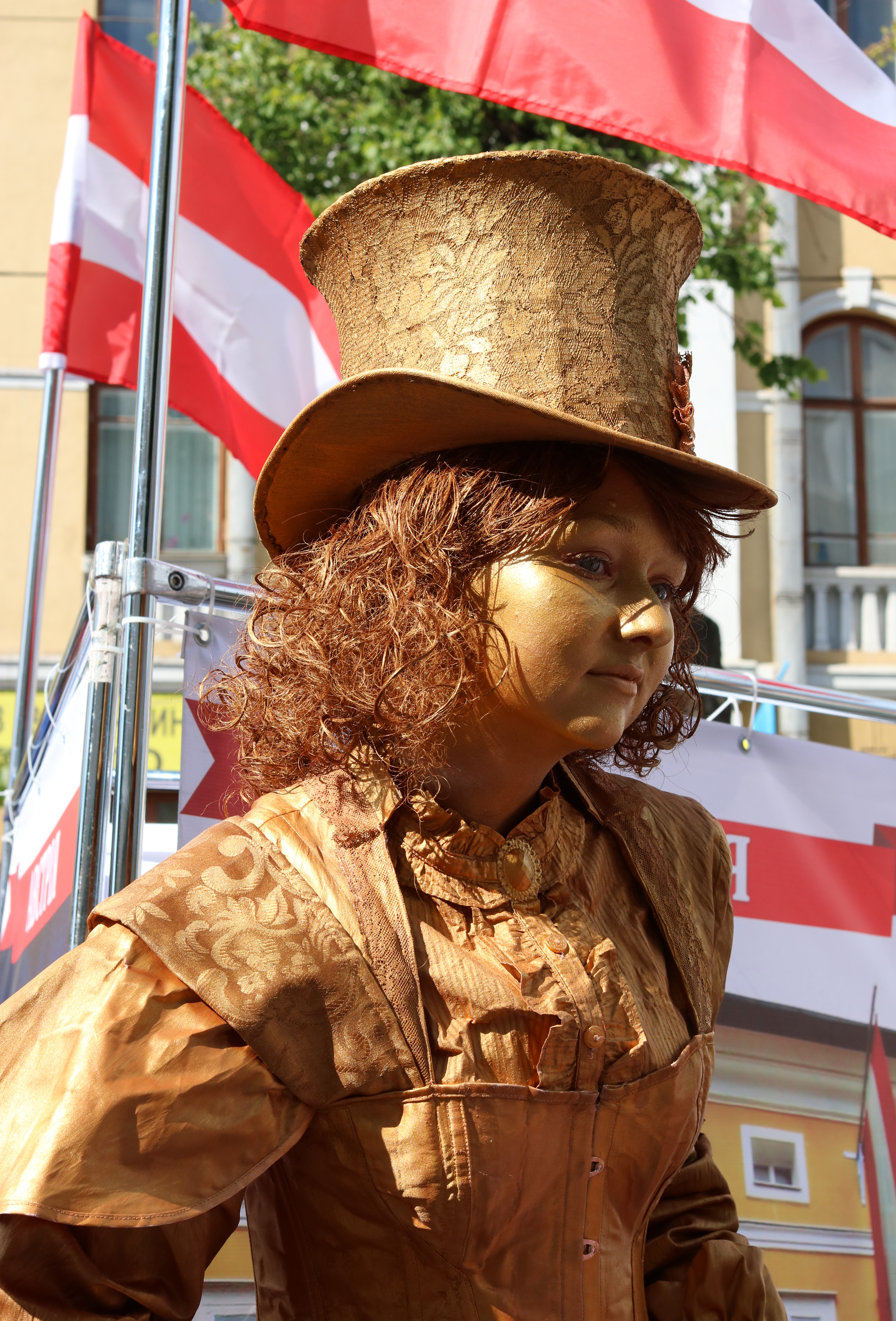
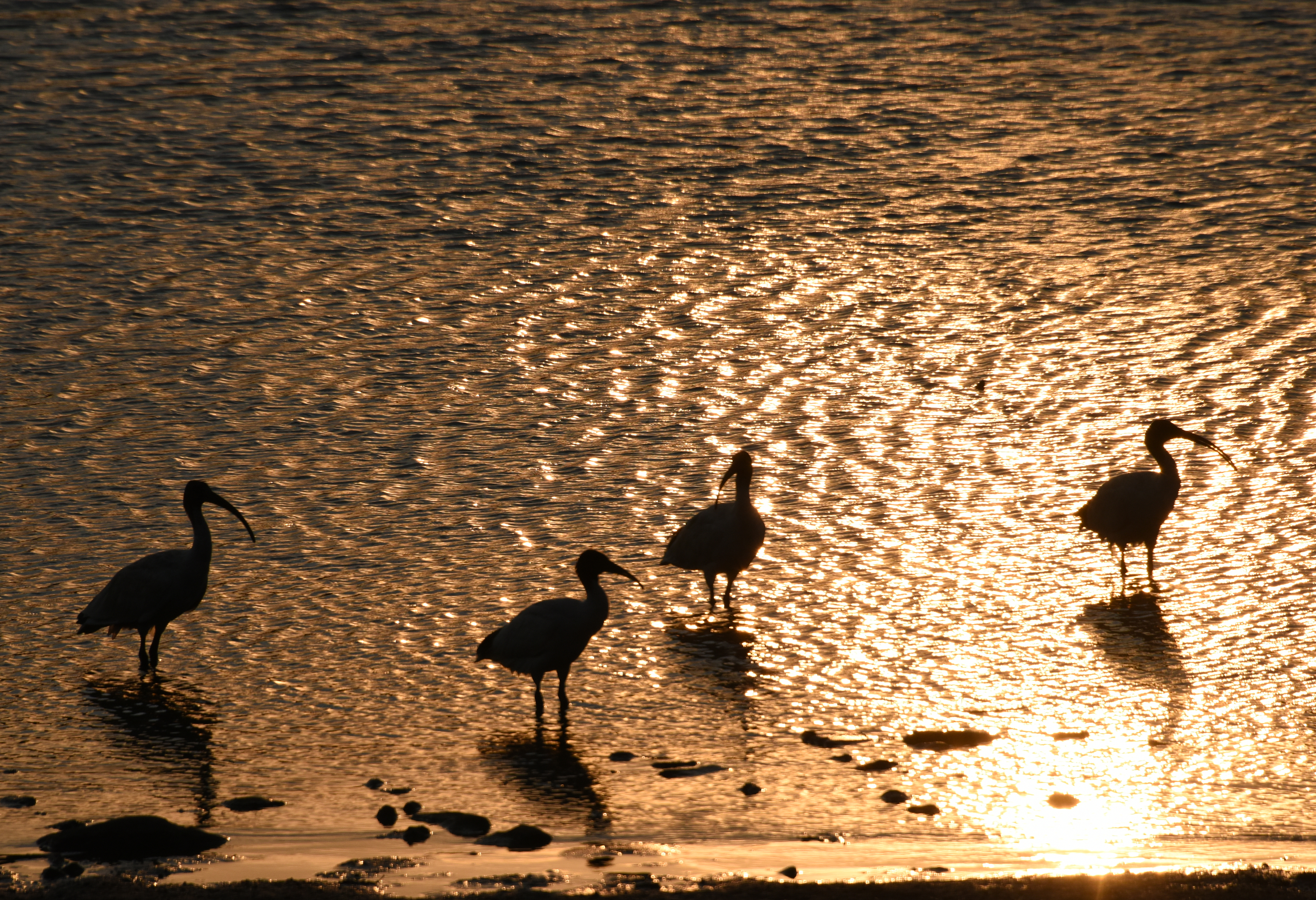
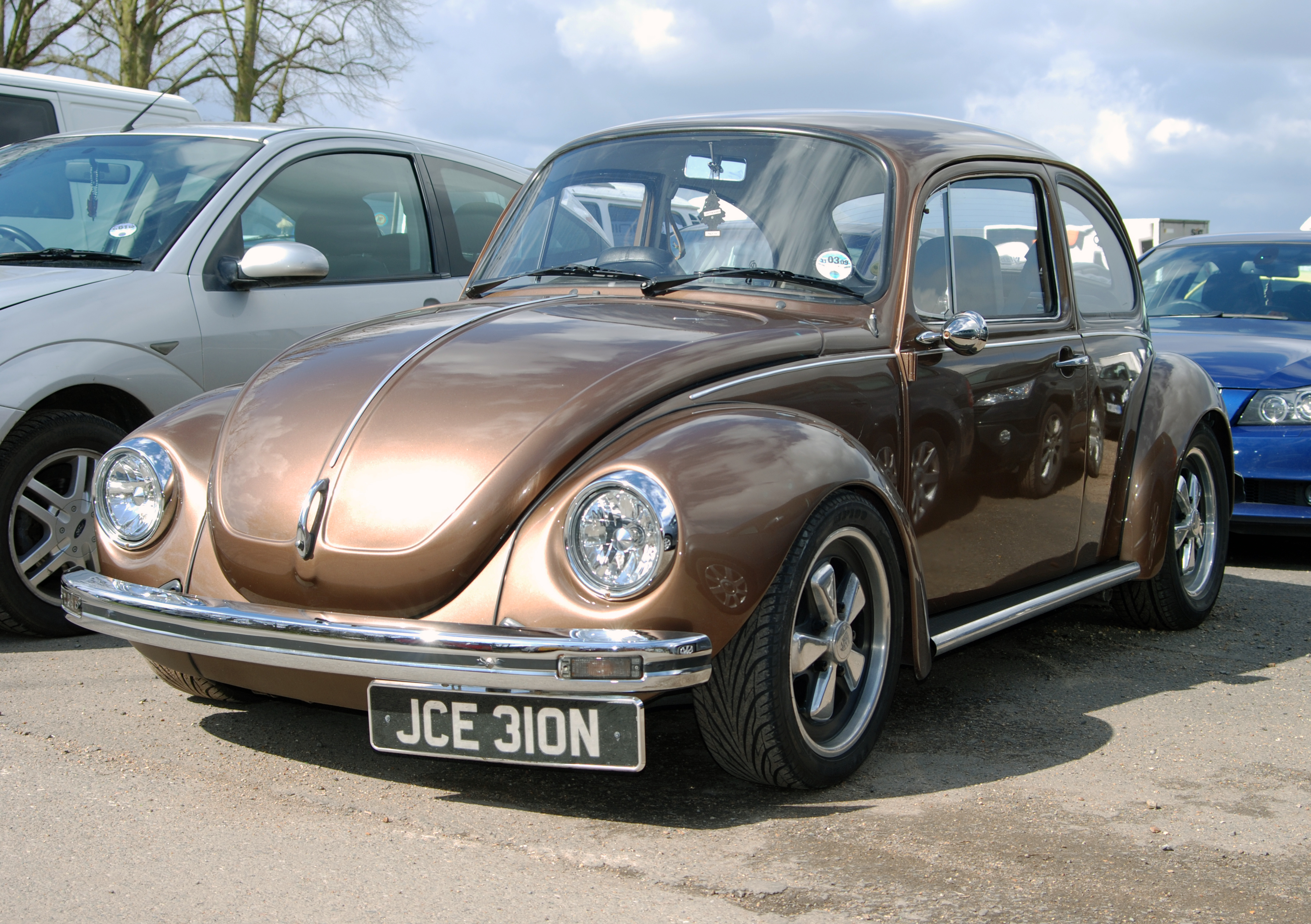
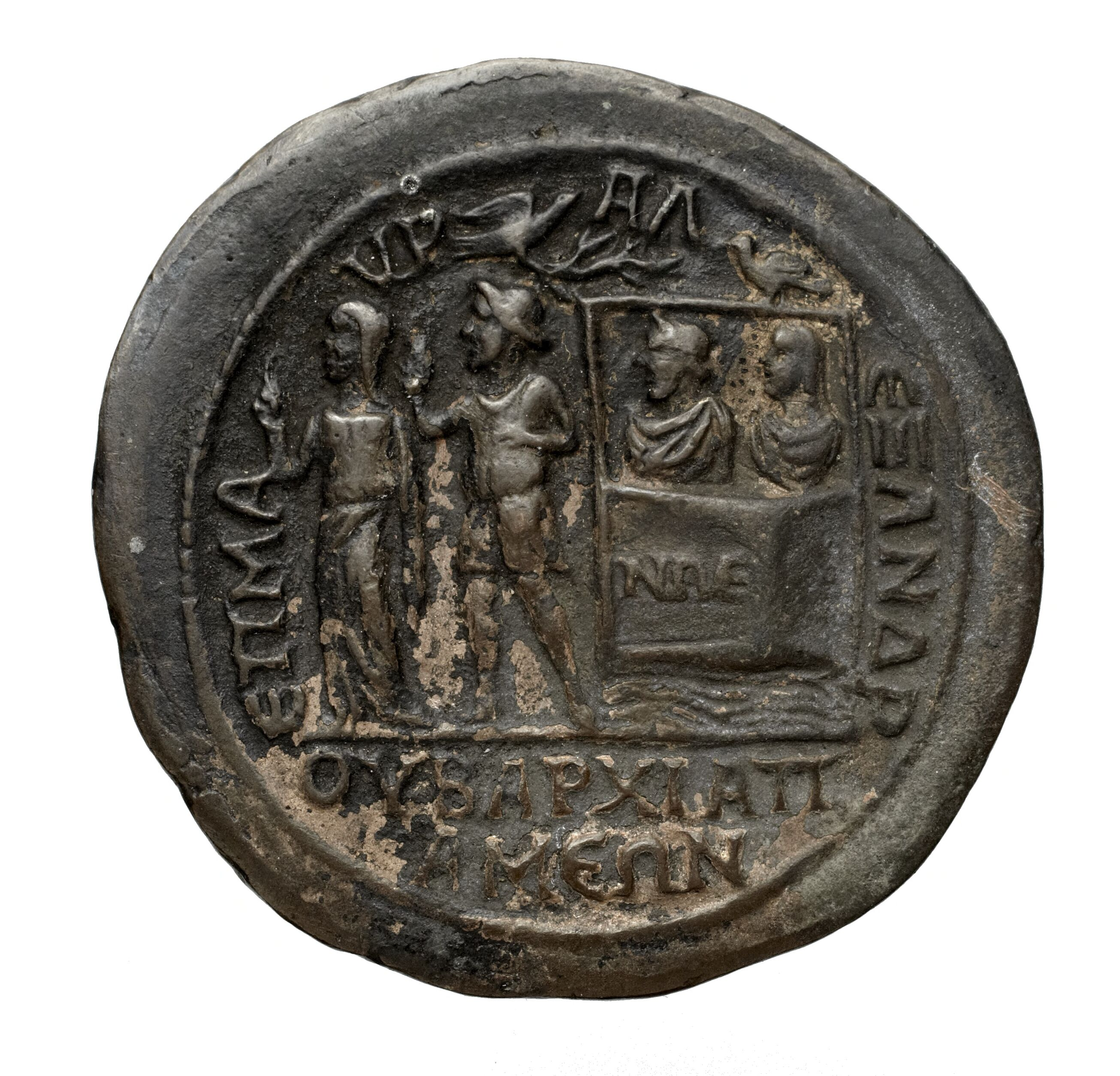
- Clockwise, from top left: Bronze medal for bravery; Living statue performer; Bronze Volkswagen Beetle; the Wikipedia logo in bronze; Bronze coin from Apamea; Centennial Park at sunset.

Common connotations
- Third place in a competition

Color coordinates
- Hex triplet: #CD7F32
- sRGB^{B} (r, g, b): (205, 127, 50)
- HSV (h, s, v): (30°, 76%, 80%)
- CIELCh_{uv} (L, C, h): (60, 81, 39°)
- Source: 99colors.net/Maerz and Paul
- ISCC–NBS descriptor: Strong orange
- B: Normalized to [0–255] (byte)

Bronze is a metallic brown color which resembles the metal alloy bronze. An archaic term for it was aeneous.

The first recorded use of bronze as a color name in English was in 1753.

== Variations ==
=== Blast-off bronze ===
Blast-Off Bronze

Color coordinates
- Hex triplet: #A57164
- sRGB^{B} (r, g, b): (165, 113, 100)
- HSV (h, s, v): (12°, 39%, 65%)
- CIELCh_{uv} (L, C, h): (53, 39, 24°)
- Source: Crayola
- ISCC–NBS descriptor: Light reddish brown
- B: Normalized to [0–255] (byte)

Blast-off bronze is one of the colors in the special set of metallic Crayola crayons called Metallic FX, the colors of which were formulated by Crayola in 2001.

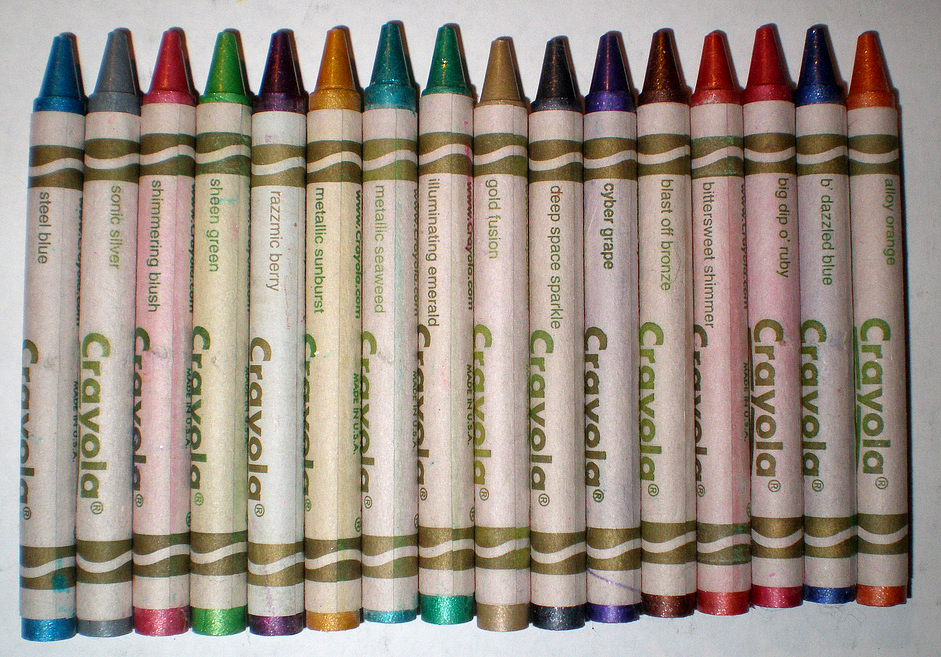
Crayola Metallic FX crayons. Blast-off bronze is the 5th crayon from the right.

=== Antique bronze ===
Antique Bronze

Color coordinates
- Hex triplet: #665D1E
- sRGB^{B} (r, g, b): (102, 93, 30)
- HSV (h, s, v): (52°, 71%, 40%)
- CIELCh_{uv} (L, C, h): (39, 37, 77°)
- Source: ISCC-NBS
- ISCC–NBS descriptor: Moderate olive
- B: Normalized to [0–255] (byte)

The first recorded use of antique bronze as a color name in English was in 1910.

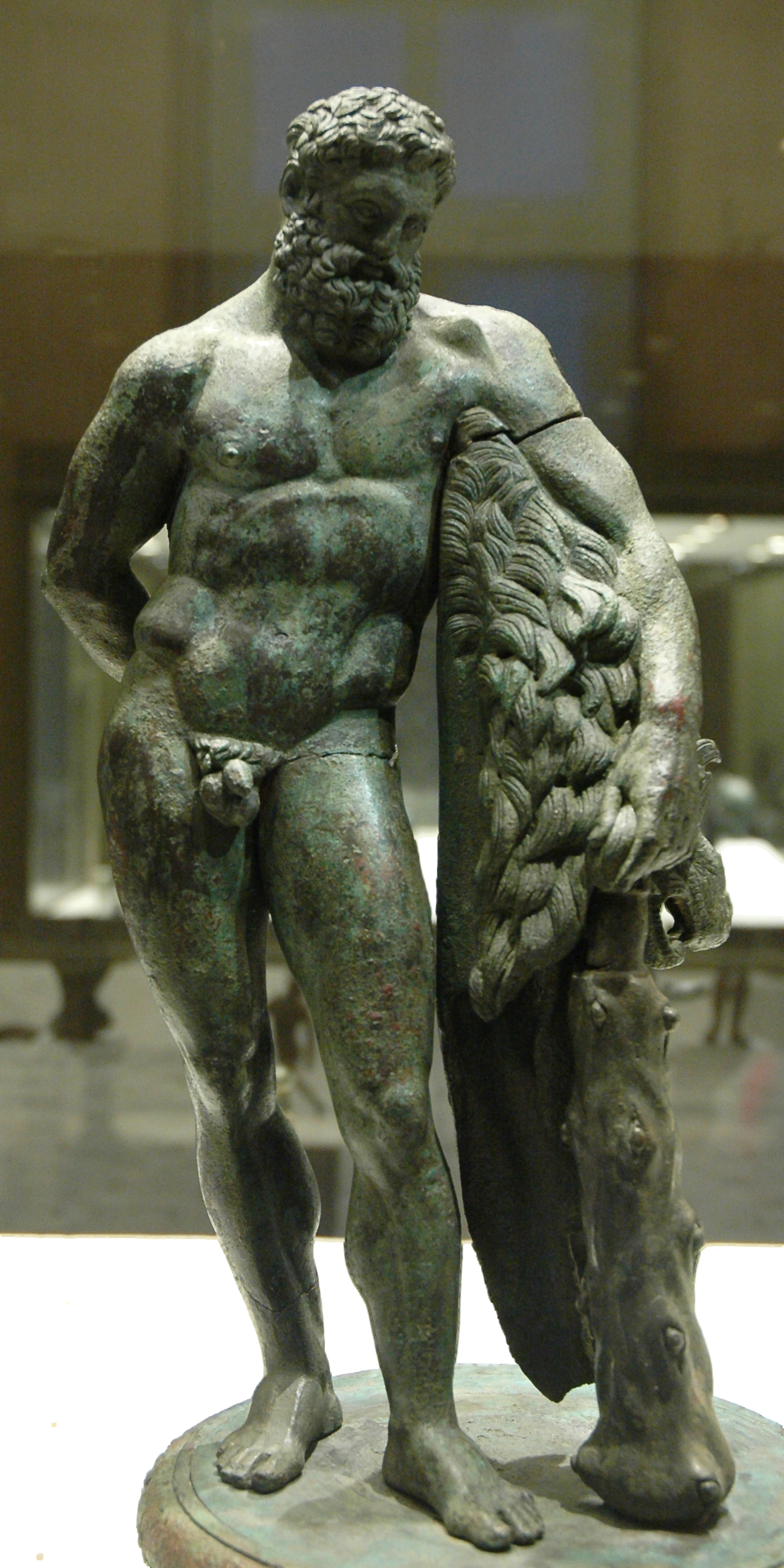
Bronze statue of Hercules with green patina

== See also ==
- Bronze and brass ornamental work
- List of colors
