= Byzantium (color) =

Dark tone of purple

Color coordinates
- Hex triplet: #702963
- sRGB^{B} (r, g, b): (112, 41, 99)
- HSV (h, s, v): (311°, 63%, 44%)
- CIELCh_{uv} (L, C, h): (29, 44, 319°)
- Source: ISCC-NBS
- ISCC–NBS descriptor: Deep reddish purple
- B: Normalized to [0–255] (byte)

The color Byzantium is a particular dark tone of purple. It originates in modern times, and, despite its name, it should not be confused with Tyrian purple (hue rendering), the color historically used by Roman and Byzantine emperors. The latter, often also referred to as "Tyrian red", is more reddish in hue, and is in fact often depicted as closer to crimson than purple. The first recorded use of byzantium as a color name in English was in 1926.

== Variations of byzantium ==
=== Byzantine ===
Byzantine

Color coordinates
- Hex triplet: #BD33A4
- sRGB^{B} (r, g, b): (189, 51, 164)
- HSV (h, s, v): (311°, 73%, 74%)
- CIELCh_{uv} (L, C, h): (47, 86, 321°)
- Source: 99colors.net/Maerz and Paul
- ISCC–NBS descriptor: Vivid reddish purple
- B: Normalized to [0–255] (byte)

The color Byzantine is displayed at right.

The color Byzantine is a rich tone of medium purple toned toward magenta.

The first recorded use of byzantine as a color name in English was in 1924.

=== Dark byzantium ===
Dark Byzantium

Color coordinates
- Hex triplet: #5D3954
- sRGB^{B} (r, g, b): (93, 57, 84)
- HSV (h, s, v): (315°, 39%, 36%)
- CIELCh_{uv} (L, C, h): (29, 23, 321°)
- Source: ISCC-NBS
- ISCC–NBS descriptor: Dark reddish purple
- B: Normalized to [0–255] (byte)

The color dark Byzantium is displayed at right.

== See also ==
- List of colors
