= Flag of the Navajo Nation =

Native American flag

Navajo Nation
- Use: National flag and ensign
- Proportion: 3:5
- Adopted: May 21, 1968; 58 years ago
- Design: Large Rainbow compassing the Flag, four Mountains one White, Blue, Yellow and Black; Navajo Reservation outline in Copper Orange.
- Designed by: Jay R. Degroat

The flag of the Navajo Nation is the official flag of the Navajo Nation, a Native American governed nation in the Four Corners states of Arizona, New Mexico, Colorado, and Utah.

== History ==
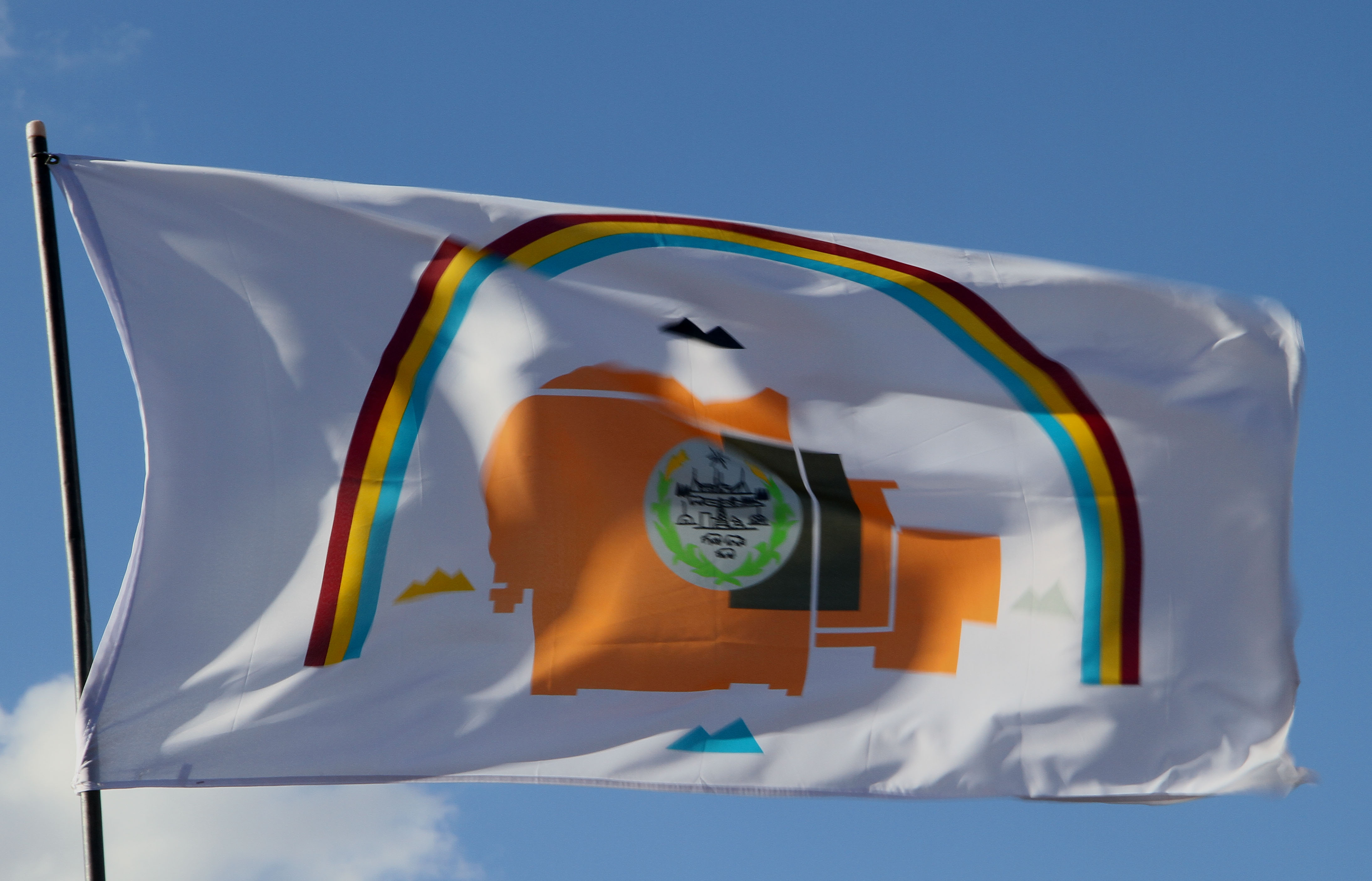
The Navajo Nation flag flying.

On 21 May 1968, the flag was adopted by the Navajo Nation Council. This flag was designed by Jay R. Degroat, a student from Mariano Lake, New Mexico and was initially selected from 140 entries for the Navajo Flag Competition. Official design of the Navajo Nation flag as it was adopted on May 21, 1968. It incorporates elements of the tribal seal designed by Amos Frank Singer and John Claw, Jr. adopted earlier, on 18 January 1952.

== Description ==
A map of the Navajo Nation, with territories in three states, is featured prominently on the nation's flag. The Hopi Reservation is completely surrounded by the Navajo Nation.

On a field of Navajo white (pale buff, tan, or copper field, sources differ), four sacred mountains of four different colors (black, white, turquoise, and yellow from the Navajo creation story) surround the center element of the flag, a map of the Navajo Nation with a white disk in the center that features elements from the Navajo tribal seal. The overall flag recalls sand painting, an art form used by the Navajos.

A rainbow symbolizing Navajo sovereignty appears over the main design.

In 1995, the Navajo flag became the first Native American tribal flag in space when Bernard A. Harris Jr. carried it aboard the space shuttle Discovery.

Ted Kaye of the North American Vexillological Association listed the Navajo flag as an ineffective design in his pamphlet Good Flag, Bad Flag under the description: "Over 20 graphic elements overwhelm the viewer and none are large enough to be seen easily."

== Tribal seal ==
The Navajo Great Seal was adopted on January 18, 1952, designed by John Claw. Around the seal is fifty arrowheads, representing the fifty states of the United States (originally 48, changed when Alaska and Hawaii were admitted in 1959). Corn is featured prominently in the seal, a fundamental element of Navajo life. In the center of the seal is four mountains surrounding various livestock, a Navajo source of wealth. An image of a yellow sun is at the top of the tribal seal. The words "Great Seal of the Navajo Nation" appear on the outside of the seal.

== See also ==
- Navajo white
- Vexillology
