= Eggshell (disambiguation) =

Eggshell is the covering of an egg.

Eggshell may also refer to:

- Eggshell (color), an off-white color
- Eggshells (film), an independent film released in 1969
- Eggshells (TV series), a 1991 Australian sitcom
