= Robin egg blue =

Color

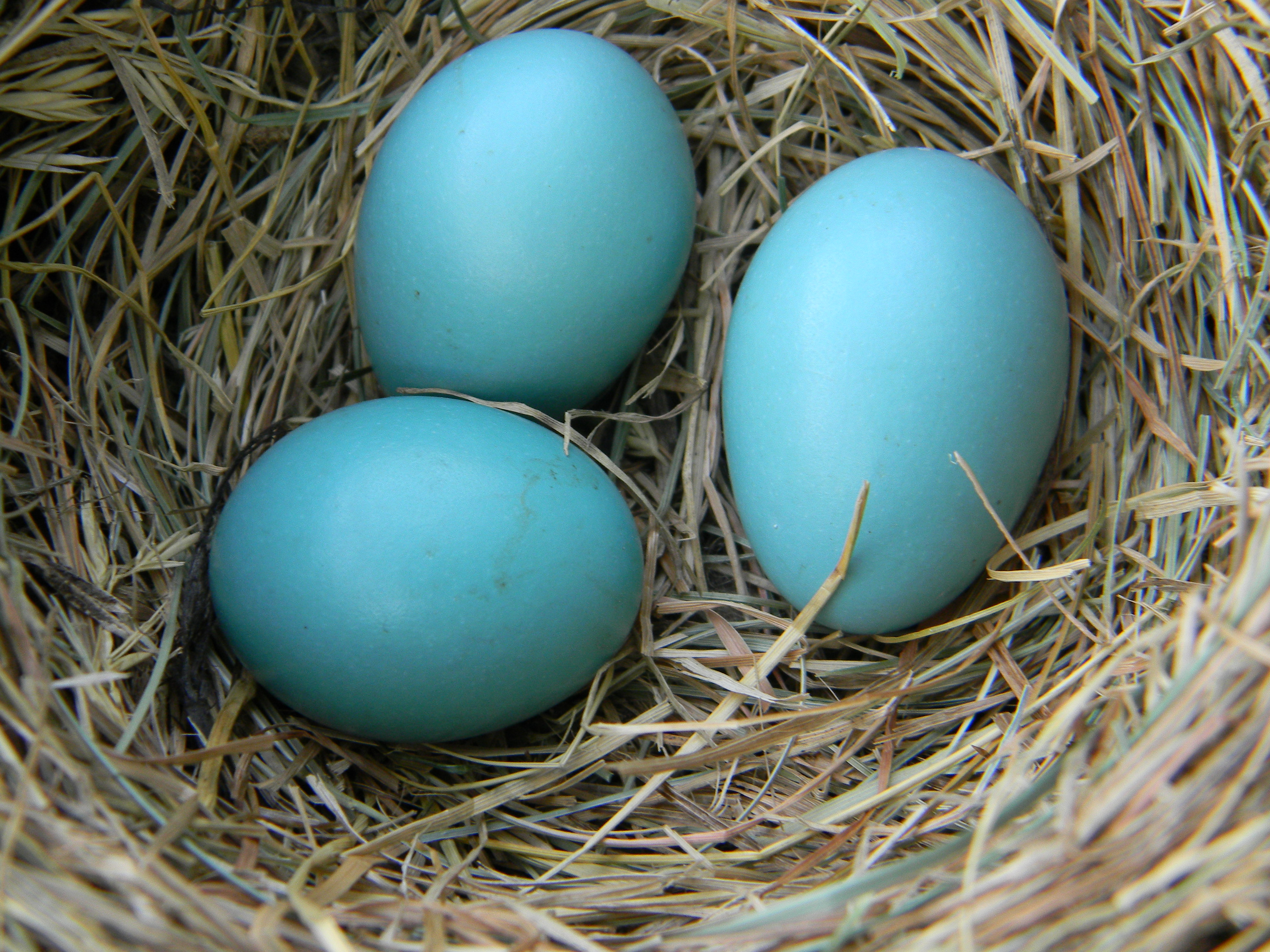
- American robin eggs

Color coordinates
- Hex triplet: #00CCCC
- sRGB^{B} (r, g, b): (0, 204, 204)
- HSV (h, s, v): (180°, 100%, 80%)
- CIELCh_{uv} (L, C, h): (75, 59, 192°)
- Source: Crayola
- ISCC–NBS descriptor: Brilliant bluish green
- B: Normalized to [0–255] (byte)

Robin egg blue, also called eggshell blue or robin's-egg blue, is a shade of cyan (a blue-green color), approximating the shade of the eggs laid by the American robin, an abundant songbird of North America. The egg pigment is biliverdin, a product of the breakdown of heme.

The first recorded use of robin egg blue as a color name in English was in 1873, though earlier references in English to colors similar to that of robin's eggs were made as early as 1844. The "robin's egg" glaze appeared during the Yongzheng Emperor’s reign (1722-35) in China, and Yixing potter Hua Fengxiang made works with "robin's egg" glaze.

== Variations ==
=== Tiffany Blue ===
Tiffany Blue

Color coordinates
- Hex triplet: #81D8D0
- sRGB^{B} (r, g, b): (129, 216, 208)
- HSV (h, s, v): (174°, 40%, 85%)
- CIELCh_{uv} (L, C, h): (81, 40, 183°)
- Source: Tiffany & Co.
- ISCC–NBS descriptor: Very light bluish green
- B: Normalized to [0–255] (byte)

Tiffany Blue is the trademarked name for the light medium tone of robin egg blue associated with Tiffany & Co., the New York City jewelry company.

== See also ==
- Eggshell (color)
