= Shades of white =

Varieties of the color white

White

Common connotations
- Purity, Heaven, snow, knowledge, clarity, innocence, brightness

Color coordinates
- Hex triplet: #FFFFFF
- sRGB^{B} (r, g, b): (255, 255, 255)
- HSV (h, s, v): (0°, 0%, 100%)
- CIELCh_{uv} (L, C, h): (100, 0, 0°)
- Source: By definition
- B: Normalized to [0–255] (byte)

Shades of white are colors that differ slightly from the CIE standard illuminant D65, a white point that represents the average color of daylight at noon. There isn't one objectively pure white, as noon daylight varies by location and atmospheric conditions, and the choice of using D65 instead of direct sunlight or a white point on the Planckian locus is arbitrary. For simplicity, this article will use the term pure white for the D65 white point.

Variations of white include what are commonly termed off-white colors, which may be considered part of a neutral color scheme.

In color theory, a shade is a pure color mixed with black (or having a lower lightness). Strictly speaking, a "shade of white" would be a neutral gray. This article is also about off-white colors that vary from pure white in hue, and in chroma (also called saturation, or intensity).

Colors often considered "shades of white" include cream, eggshell, ivory, Navajo white, and vanilla. Even the lighting of a room, however, can cause a pure white to be perceived as off-white.

Off-white colors were pervasively paired with beiges in the 1930s, and especially popular again from roughly 1955 to 1975. In terms of paint, off-white paints are now becoming more popular, with Benjamin Moore having 152 shades of off-whites, Behr having 167, and PPG having 315.

Whiteness measures the degree to which a surface is white in colorimetry.

== Web colors ==
Below is a chart showing the computer web color shades of white. An achromatic white is a white color in which the red, green, and blues codes are exactly equal. The web colors white and white smoke are achromatic colors. A chromatic shade of white is a white color in which the red, green, and blue codes are not exactly equal, but are close to each other, which is what makes it a shade of white.

HTML color name	Sample		Hex triplet
	(rendered by name)	(rendered by hex triplet)
White			#FFFFFF
Whitesmoke			#F5F5F5
White solid			#F4F5FA
Snow			#FFFAFA
Honeydew			#F0FFF0
Mintcream			#F5FFFA
Azure			#F0FFFF
Aliceblue			#F0F8FF
Ghostwhite			#F8F8FF
Seashell			#FFF5EE
Beige			#F5F5DC
Oldlace			#FDF5E6
Floralwhite			#FFFAF0
Ivory			#FFFFF0
Linen			#FAF0E6
Lavenderblush			#FFF0F5

== White ==
White
#FFFFFF

White

Color coordinates
- Hex triplet: #FFFFFF
- sRGB^{B} (r, g, b): (255, 255, 255)
- HSV (h, s, v): (0°, 0%, 100%)
- CIELCh_{uv} (L, C, h): (100, 0, 0°)
- Source: By definition
- ISCC–NBS descriptor: White
- B: Normalized to [0–255] (byte)

White in the sRGB color space and many other color gamuts, is based on the CIE standard illuminant D65. Its purpose is to emulate daylight during noon, to give a natural illumination. The perception of white is evoked when light is distributed along the spectrum roughly like a blackbody from 5800–6800K, and when such light has high brightness compared to the surroundings. A white visual stimulation will have negligible hue and grayness.

== Sunlight ==
Sunlight
#FFF3EF

Sunlight

Color coordinates
- Hex triplet: #FFF3EF
- sRGB^{B} (r, g, b): (255, 243, 239)
- HSV (h, s, v): (15°, 6%, 100%)
- CIELCh_{uv} (L, C, h): (97, 8, 32°)
- Source: CU Boulder
- ISCC–NBS descriptor: White
- B: Normalized to [0–255] (byte)

Sunlight is the color of sunlight as viewed from outer space, without any atmospheric effects. The calculated CIE 1931 xy chromaticity coordinates for the color of the Sun are approximately 0.3233 and 0.3326. With xy coordinates of 0.3230 and 03329, the sRGB color #FFF3EF is the one that gets the closest to these coordinates.

== Chalk white ==
Chalk white
#FBFFFF

Chalk white

Color coordinates
- Hex triplet: #FBFFFF
- sRGB^{B} (r, g, b): (251, 255, 255)
- HSV (h, s, v): (180°, 2%, 100%)
- CIELCh_{uv} (L, C, h): (100, 0, 0°)
- Source: Pourpre
- ISCC–NBS descriptor: White
- B: Normalized to [0–255] (byte)

Chalk white is a tint of white resembling the chalk color.

== Ghost white ==
Ghost white
#F8F8FF

Ghost white

Color coordinates
- Hex triplet: #F8F8FF
- sRGB^{B} (r, g, b): (248, 248, 255)
- HSV (h, s, v): (240°, 3%, 100%)
- CIELCh_{uv} (L, C, h): (98, 5, 266°)
- Source: X11
- ISCC–NBS descriptor: White
- B: Normalized to [0–255] (byte)

The web color ghost white is a tint of white loosely inspired by traditional representations of ghosts. There is no evidence that this color name was in use before the X11 color names were formulated in 1987.

== White smoke ==
White smoke
#F5F5F5

White smoke

Color coordinates
- Hex triplet: #F5F5F5
- sRGB^{B} (r, g, b): (245, 245, 245)
- HSV (h, s, v): (0°, 0%, 96%)
- CIELCh_{uv} (L, C, h): (97, 0, 0°)
- Source: X11
- ISCC–NBS descriptor: White
- B: Normalized to [0–255] (byte)

The web color white smoke is displayed on the left.

There is no evidence that this color name was in use before the X11 color names were formulated in 1987. The color is also known as Cultured Pearl, one of crayon colors issued by Crayola in its 16-pack of Pearl Brite Crayons.

== White solid ==
White solid
#F4F5FA

White solid

Color coordinates
- Hex triplet: #F4F5FA
- sRGB^{B} (r, g, b): (244, 245, 250)
- HSV (h, s, v): (230°, 2%, 98%)
- CIELCh_{uv} (L, C, h): (97, 4, 258°)
- Source: Color Hex Map
- ISCC–NBS descriptor: White
- B: Normalized to [0–255] (byte)

The web color white solid is displayed on the left.

There is no evidence that this color name was in use before the X11 color names were formulated in 1987. Sometimes also known as Ghost White, the color has marked blue hues, although is otherwise very close to being completely white in the RGB color system.

== Baby powder ==
Baby powder
#FEFEFA

Baby powder

Color coordinates
- Hex triplet: #FEFEFA
- sRGB^{B} (r, g, b): (254, 254, 250)
- HSV (h, s, v): (60°, 2%, 100%)
- CIELCh_{uv} (L, C, h): (100, 0, 0°)
- Source: Crayola
- ISCC–NBS descriptor: White
- B: Normalized to [0–255] (byte)

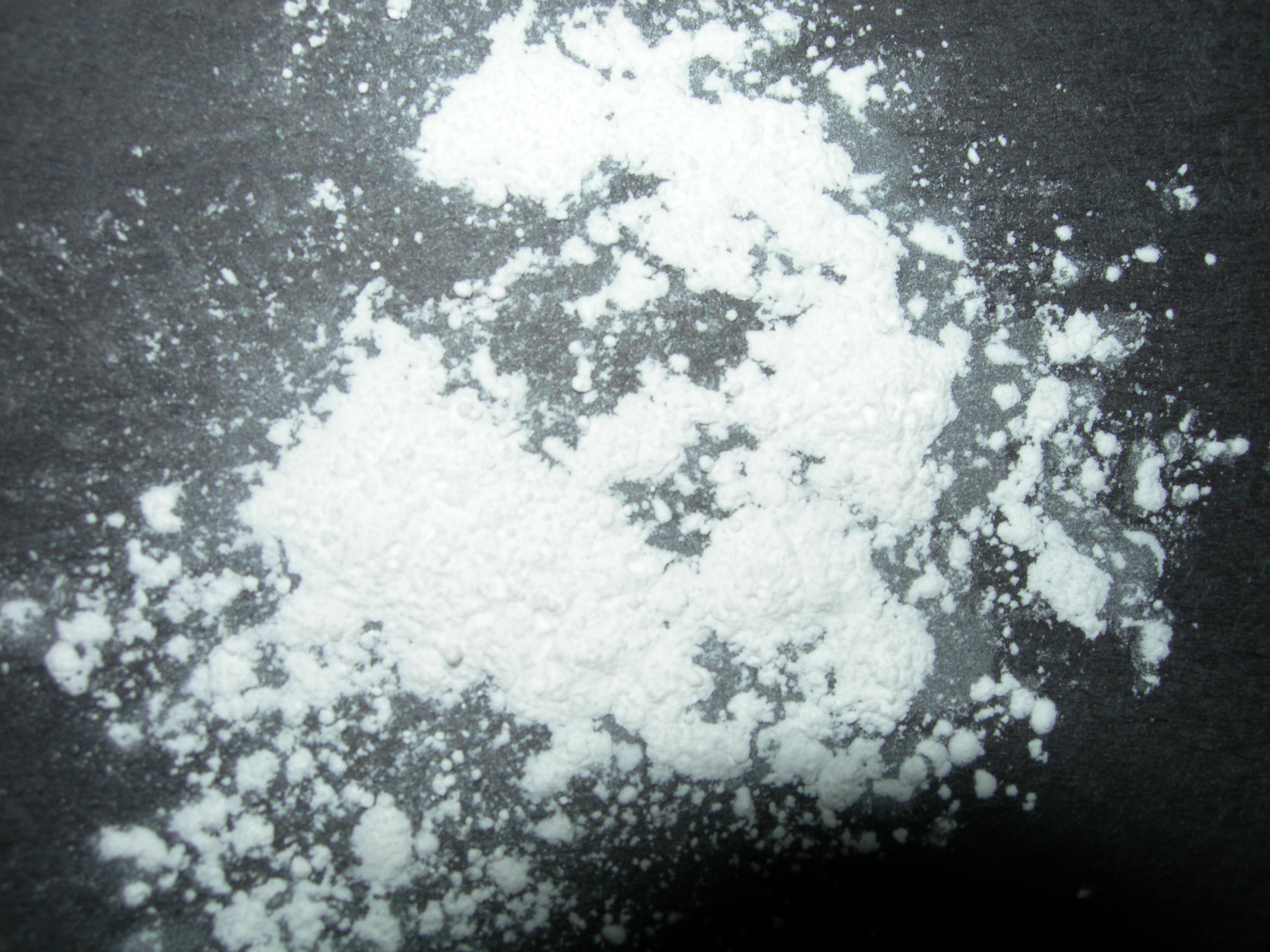
Talcum or baby powder

The Crayola crayon color baby powder was introduced in 1994 as part of its specialty Magic Scent crayon collection. It is a very light yellow.

== Snow ==
Snow
#FFFAFA

Snow

Color coordinates
- Hex triplet: #FFFAFA
- sRGB^{B} (r, g, b): (255, 250, 250)
- HSV (h, s, v): (0°, 2%, 100%)
- CIELCh_{uv} (L, C, h): (99, 3, 12°)
- Source: X11
- ISCC–NBS descriptor: White
- B: Normalized to [0–255] (byte)

The web color snow is displayed at left.

The first recorded use of snow as a color name in English was in 1000.

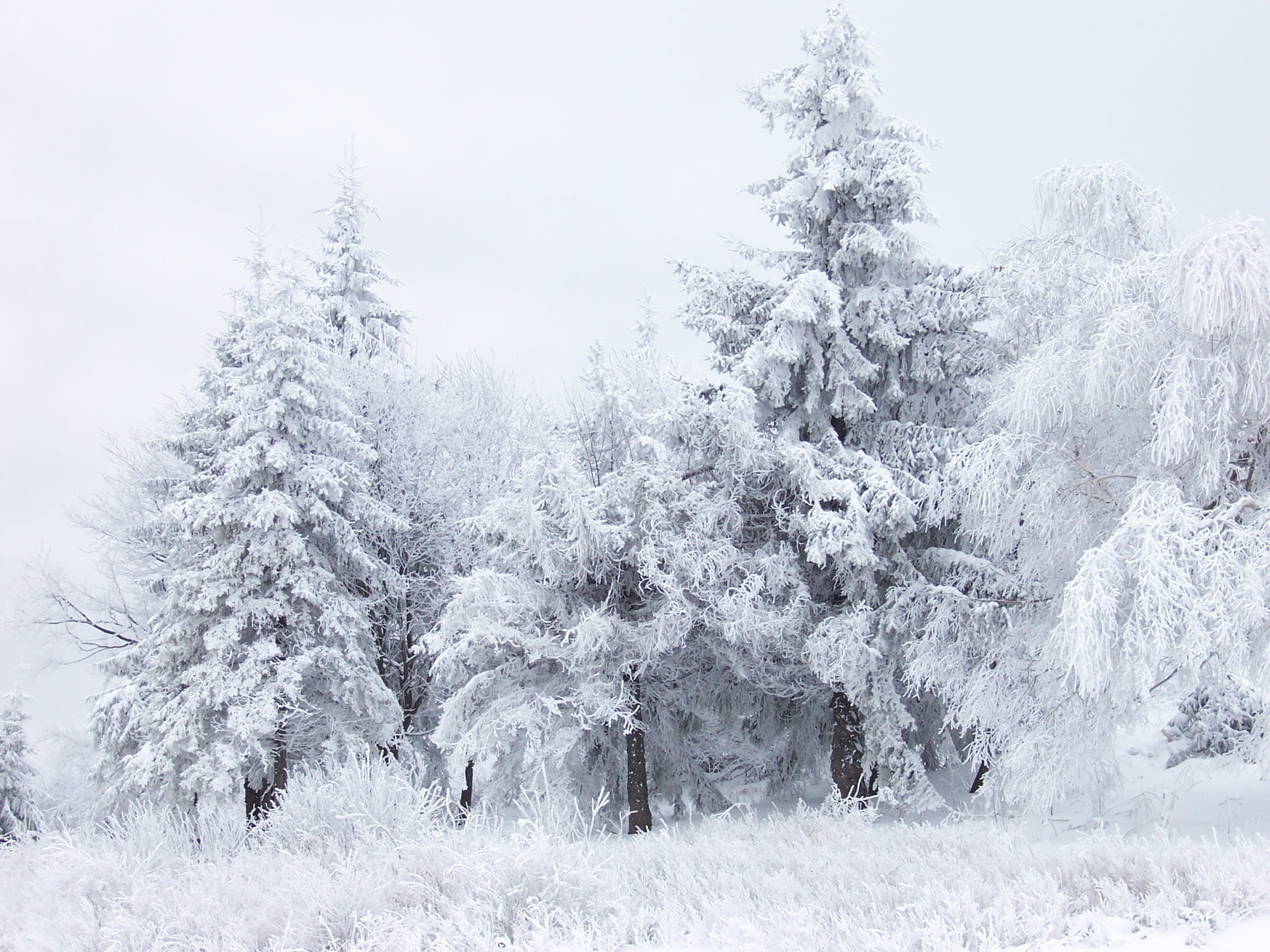
Snow in Bulgaria

The color snow was included as one of the X11 colors when they were formulated in 1987.

== Ivory ==
Ivory
#FFFFF0

Ivory

Color coordinates
- Hex triplet: #FFFFF0
- sRGB^{B} (r, g, b): (255, 255, 240)
- HSV (h, s, v): (60°, 6%, 100%)
- CIELCh_{uv} (L, C, h): (100, 0, 0°)
- Source: X11
- ISCC–NBS descriptor: Pale yellow green
- B: Normalized to [0–255] (byte)

Ivory is an off-white color that resembles ivory, the material out of which the teeth and tusks of animals (such as the elephant and the walrus) are made. It has a very slight tint of yellow.

The first recorded use of ivory as a color name in English was in 1385.

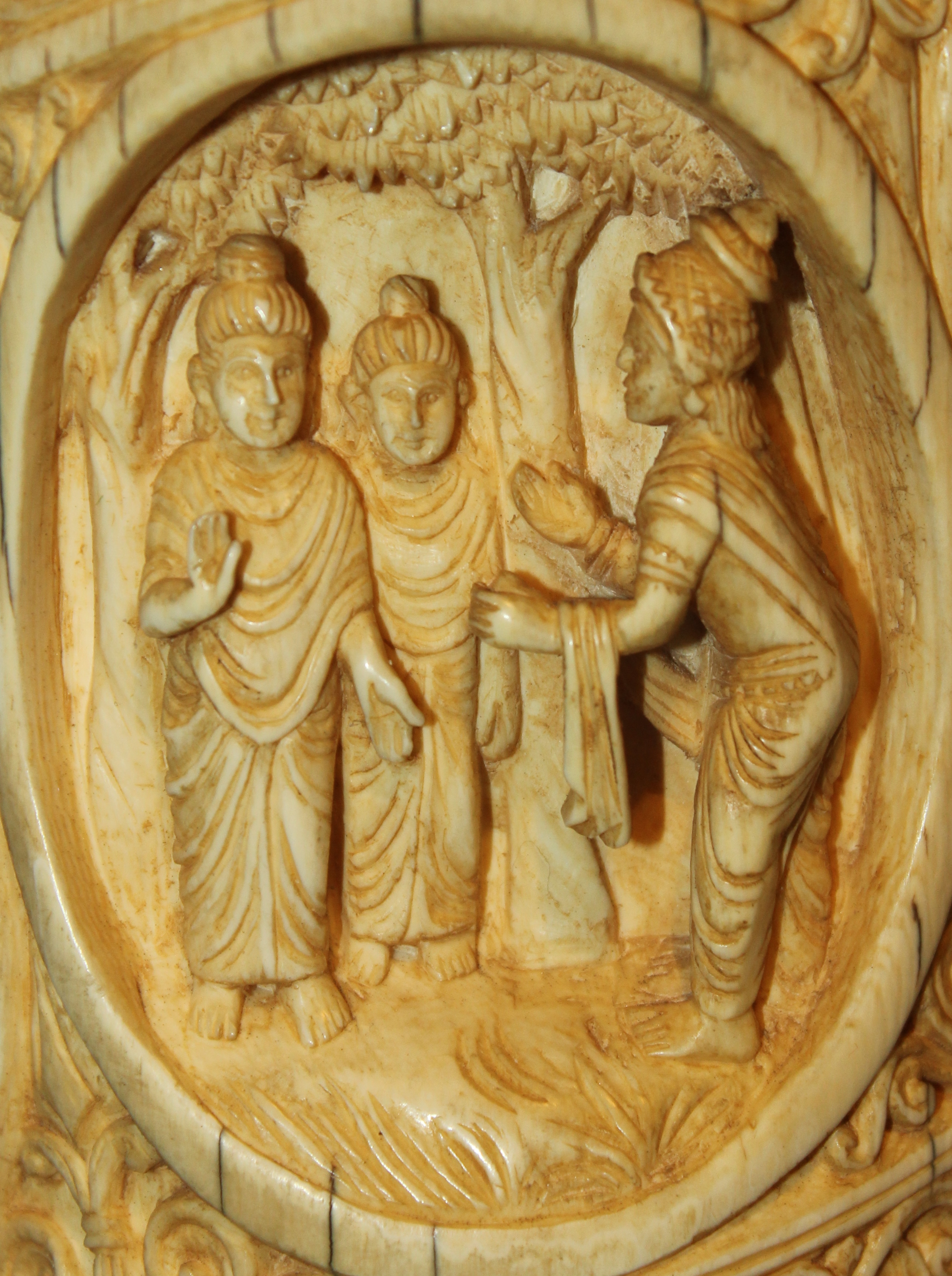
A carving in ivory

The color ivory was included as one of the X11 colors when they were formulated in 1987.

== Floral white ==
Floral white
#FFFAF0

Floral white

Color coordinates
- Hex triplet: #FFFAF0
- sRGB^{B} (r, g, b): (255, 250, 240)
- HSV (h, s, v): (40°, 6%, 100%)
- CIELCh_{uv} (L, C, h): (98, 9, 67°)
- Source: X11
- ISCC–NBS descriptor: Pale yellow green
- B: Normalized to [0–255] (byte)

The web color floral white is displayed at left.

There is no evidence that this color name was in use before the X11 color names were formulated in 1987.

== Seashell ==
Seashell
#FFF5EE

Seashell

Color coordinates
- Hex triplet: #FFF5EE
- sRGB^{B} (r, g, b): (255, 245, 238)
- HSV (h, s, v): (25°, 7%, 100%)
- CIELCh_{uv} (L, C, h): (97, 9, 47°)
- Source: X11
- ISCC–NBS descriptor: Yellowish white
- B: Normalized to [0–255] (byte)

Seashell is an off-white color that resembles some of the very pale pinkish tones that are common in many seashells.

The first recorded use of seashell as a color name in English was in 1926.

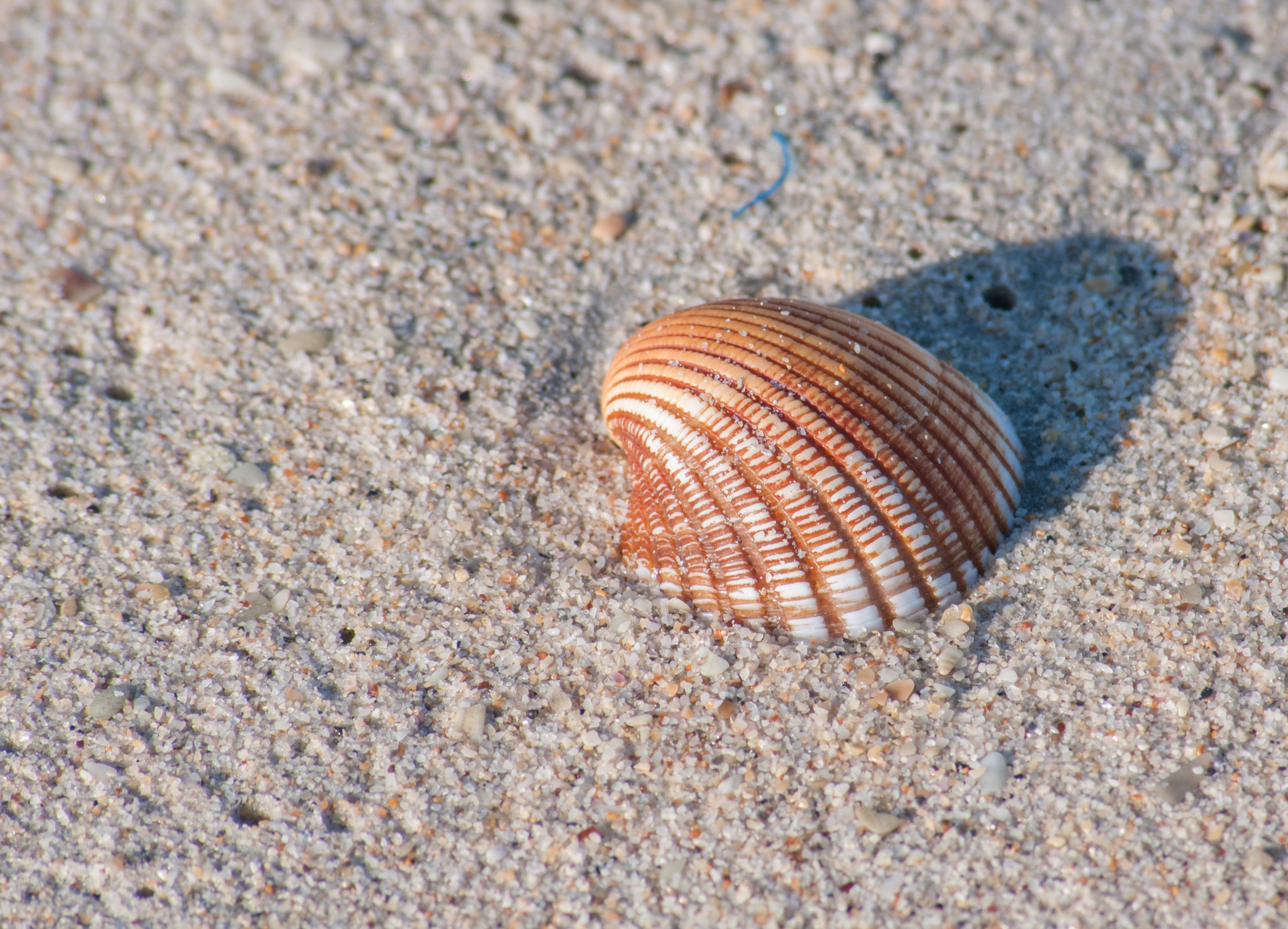
Seashell in the sand

In 1987, seashell was included as one of the X11 colors.

== Bone white ==
Bone white
#F9F6EE

Bone white

Color coordinates
- Hex triplet: #F9F6EE
- sRGB^{B} (r, g, b): (249, 246, 238)
- HSV (h, s, v): (44°, 4%, 98%)
- CIELCh_{uv} (L, C, h): (97, 7, 72°)
- Source: HTML Color Codes
- B: Normalized to [0–255] (byte)

Bone white is a yellowish-gray shade of white which represents the color of natural, unbleached bones.

== Cornsilk ==
Cornsilk
#FFF8DC

Cornsilk

Color coordinates
- Hex triplet: #FFF8DC
- sRGB^{B} (r, g, b): (255, 248, 220)
- HSV (h, s, v): (48°, 14%, 100%)
- CIELCh_{uv} (L, C, h): (97, 22, 75°)
- Source: X11
- ISCC–NBS descriptor: Pale yellow green
- B: Normalized to [0–255] (byte)

Cornsilk is a color that is a representation of the color of cornsilk.

The first recorded use of cornsilk as a color name in English was in 1927.

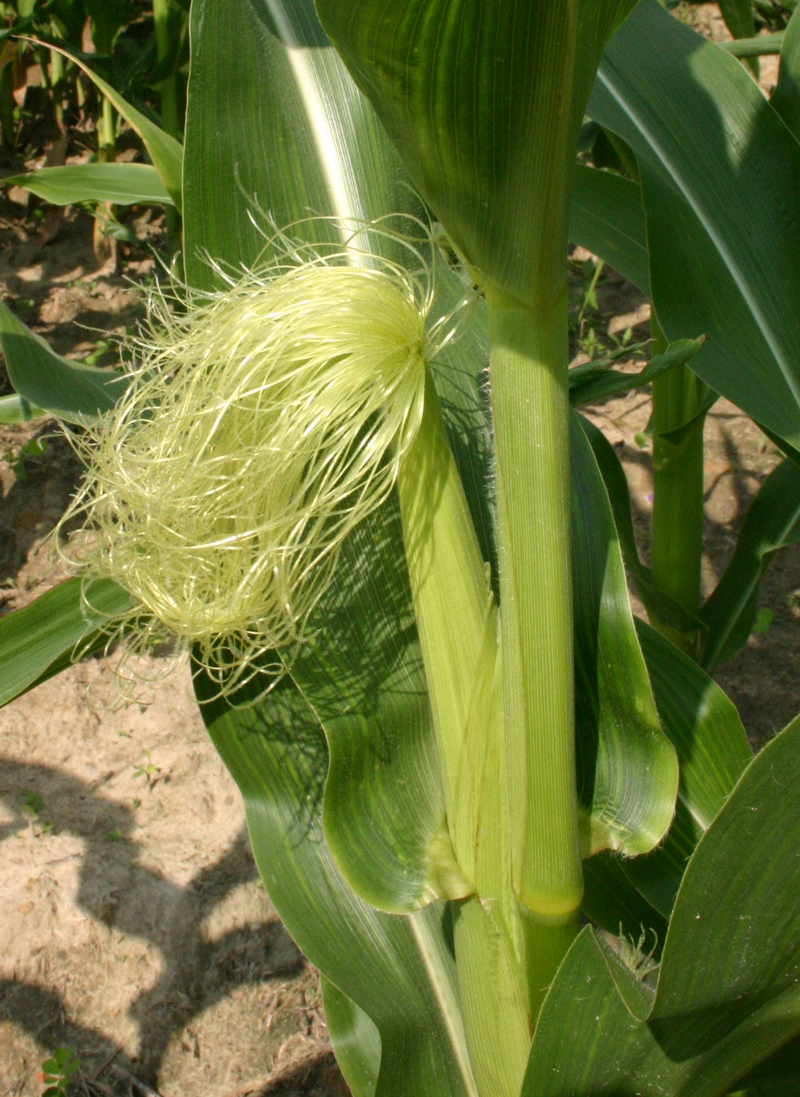
Cornsilk

In 1987, cornsilk was included as one of the X11 colors.

== Old lace ==
Old lace
#FDF5E6

Old lace

Color coordinates
- Hex triplet: #FDF5E6
- sRGB^{B} (r, g, b): (253, 245, 230)
- HSV (h, s, v): (39°, 9%, 99%)
- CIELCh_{uv} (L, C, h): (97, 13, 66°)
- Source: X11
- ISCC–NBS descriptor: Pale yellow green
- B: Normalized to [0–255] (byte)

Old lace is a web color that is a very pale yellowish orange that resembles the color of an old lace tablecloth.

It is one of the original X11 colors.

Old lace is used as a color of a certain kind of Caucasian skin type in art.

== Cream ==
Cream
#FFFDD0

Cream

Color coordinates
- Hex triplet: #FFFDD0
- sRGB^{B} (r, g, b): (255, 253, 208)
- HSV (h, s, v): (57°, 18%, 100%)
- CIELCh_{uv} (L, C, h): (98, 33, 84°)
- Source: X11
- ISCC–NBS descriptor: Light yellow green
- B: Normalized to [0–255] (byte)

Cream is a color that is a representation of the color of the cream produced from the milk of cattle.

The first recorded use of cream as a color name in English was in 1590.

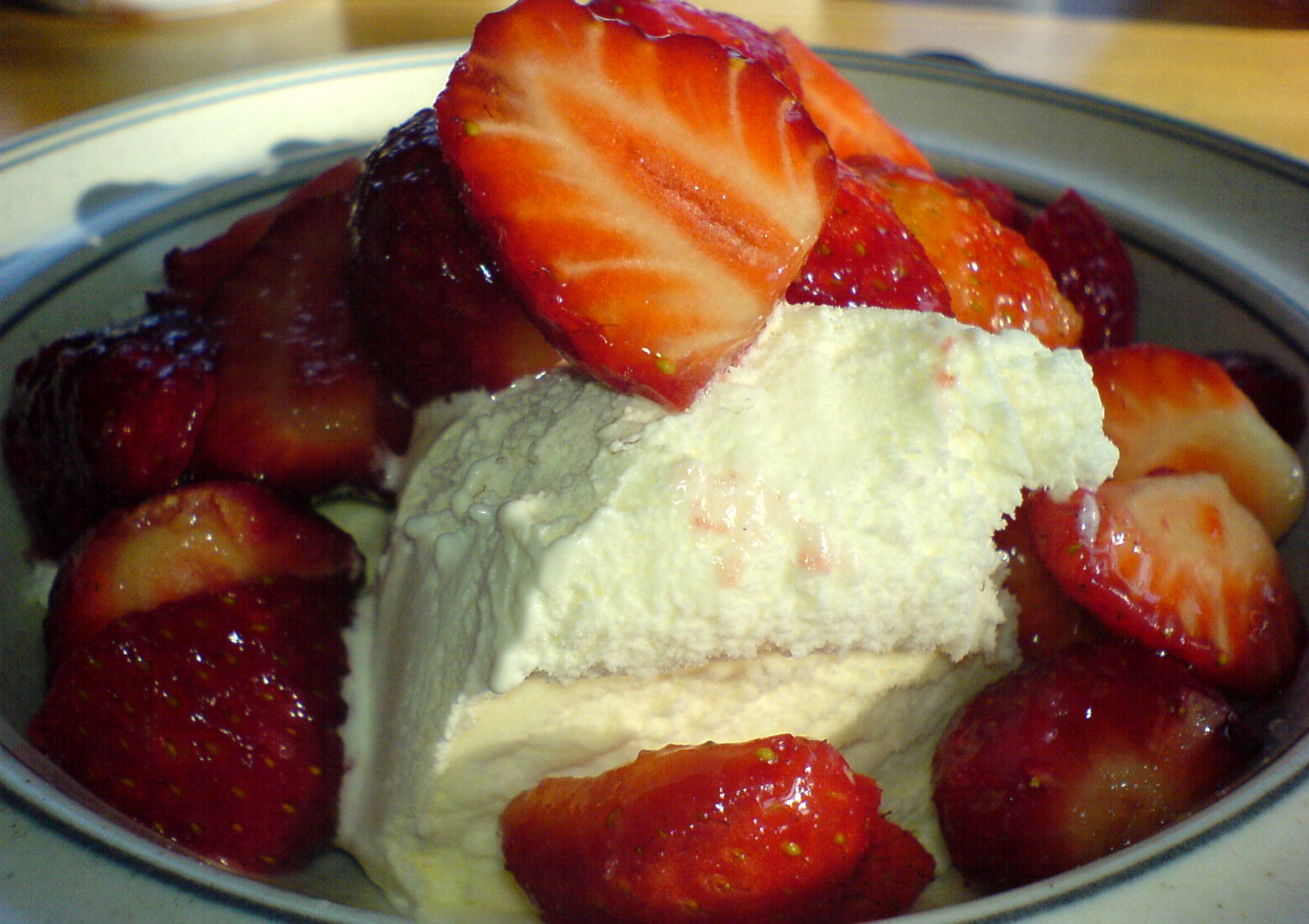
Strawberries with cream

In 1987, cream was included as one of the X11 colors.

== White Chocolate ==
White Chocolate
#EDE6D6

White Chocolate

Color coordinates
- Hex triplet: #EDE6D6
- sRGB^{B} (r, g, b): (237, 230, 214)
- HSV (h, s, v): (42°, 10%, 93%)
- CIELCh_{uv} (L, C, h): (91, 14, 69°)
- Source: Encycolorpedia
- ISCC–NBS descriptor: Pale yellow
- B: Normalized to [0–255] (byte)

White Chocolate is a color that is a representation of the color of white chocolate made of cocoa butter, sugar and milk.

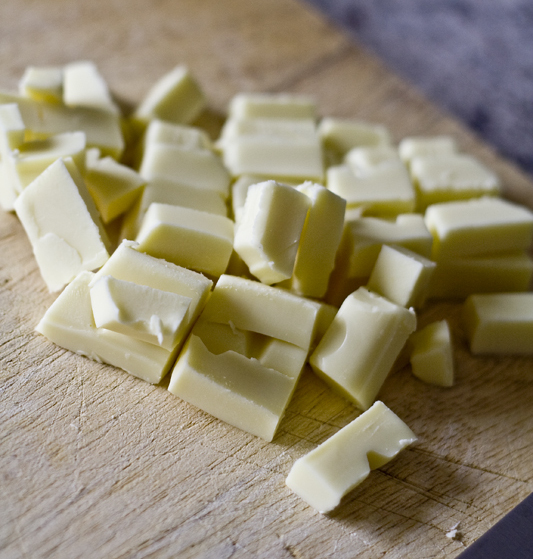

== Beige ==
Beige
#F5F5DC

Beige

Color coordinates
- Hex triplet: #F5F5DC
- sRGB^{B} (r, g, b): (245, 245, 220)
- HSV (h, s, v): (60°, 10%, 96%)
- CIELCh_{uv} (L, C, h): (96, 19, 86°)
- Source: X11
- ISCC–NBS descriptor: Pale yellow green
- B: Normalized to [0–255] (byte)

The color beige is displayed at left.

The first recorded use of beige as a color name in English was in 1887.

The term originates from beige cloth, a cotton fabric left undyed in its natural color.

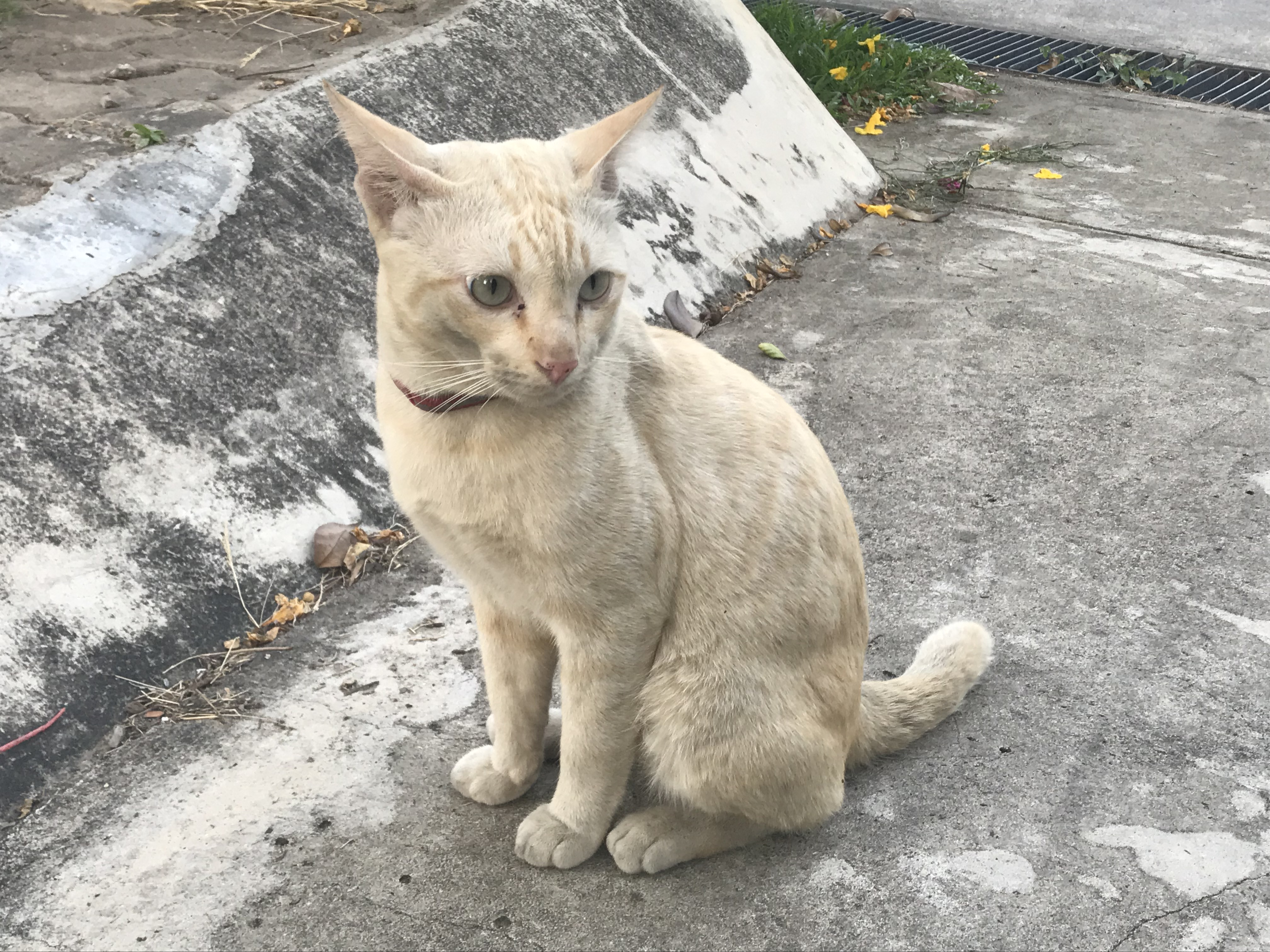
A beige cat

Items that are of beige color in real world applications are typically closer to brown than they are to white.

== Parchment ==
Parchment
#F1E9D2

Parchment

Color coordinates
- Hex triplet: #F1E9D2
- sRGB^{B} (r, g, b): (241, 233, 210)
- HSV (h, s, v): (45°, 13%, 95%)
- CIELCh_{uv} (L, C, h): (92, 19, 72°)
- Source: Xona.com Color List
- ISCC–NBS descriptor: Pale yellow green
- B: Normalized to [0–255] (byte)

Displayed at left is the color parchment.

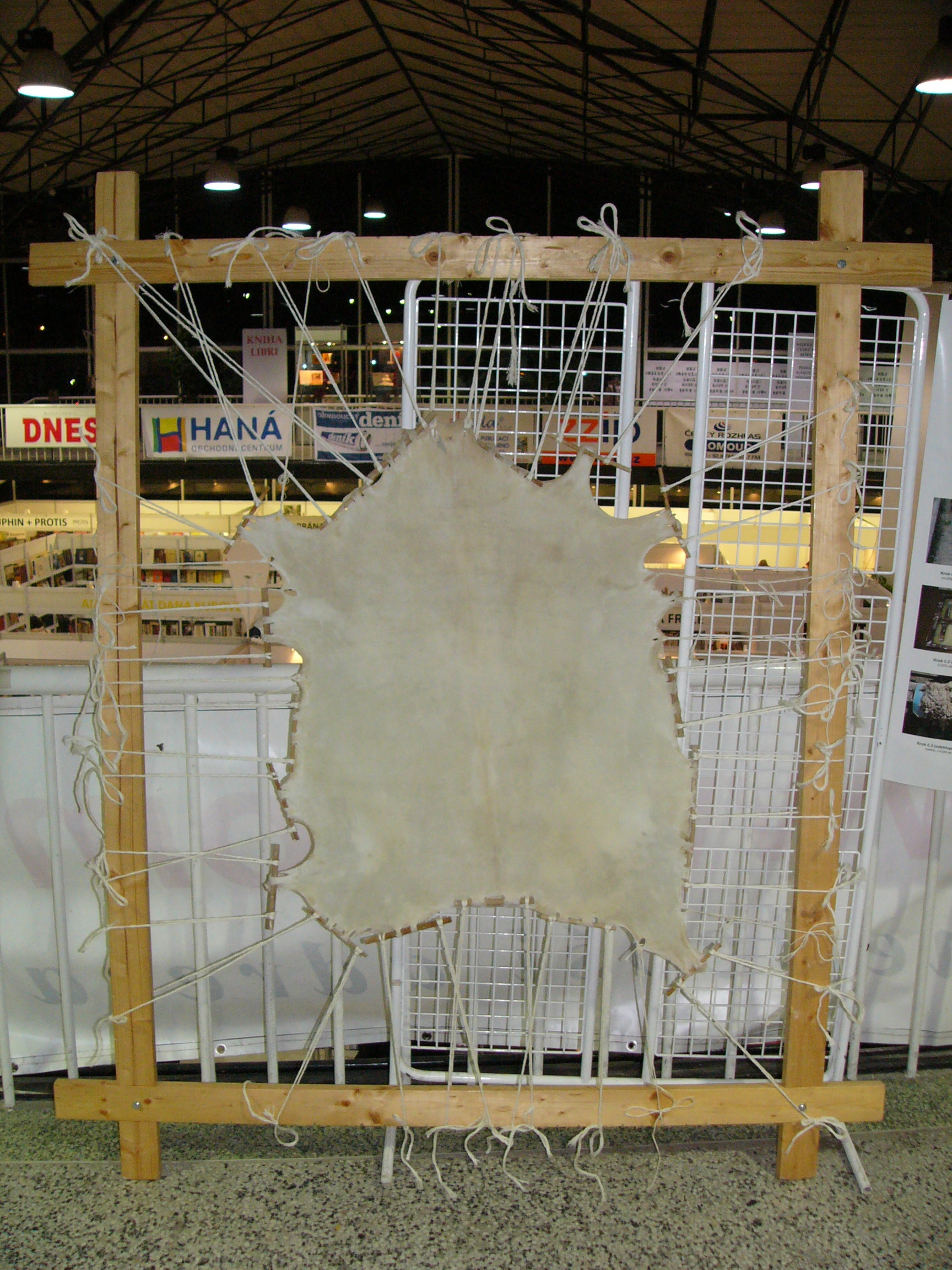
Parchment made from goatskin

In 2001, this was made into one of the colors on the Xona.com color list.

== Antique white ==
Antique white
#FAEBD7

Antique white

Color coordinates
- Hex triplet: #FAEBD7
- sRGB^{B} (r, g, b): (250, 235, 215)
- HSV (h, s, v): (34°, 14%, 98%)
- CIELCh_{uv} (L, C, h): (94, 20, 59°)
- Source: X11
- ISCC–NBS descriptor: Pale yellow
- B: Normalized to [0–255] (byte)

Antique white is a web color.

The color name antique white began to be used in 1987 when the X11 colors were first formulated.

== Champagne ==
Champagne
#F7E7CE

Champagne

Color coordinates
- Hex triplet: #F7E7CE
- sRGB^{B} (r, g, b): (247, 231, 206)
- HSV (h, s, v): (37°, 17%, 97%)
- CIELCh_{uv} (L, C, h): (92, 23, 62°)
- Source: Maerz and Paul
- ISCC–NBS descriptor: Pale yellow
- B: Normalized to [0–255] (byte)

The color champagne is displayed at left.

The color's name is derived from the typical color of the beverage champagne.

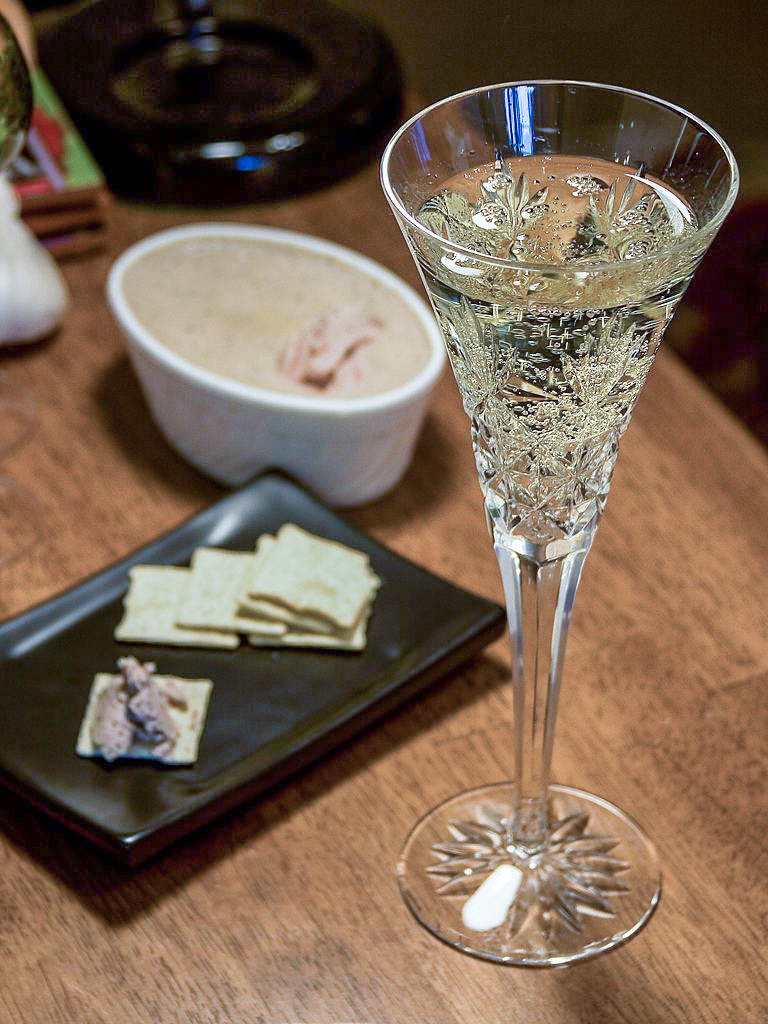
A glass of champagne

The first recorded use of champagne as a color name in English was in 1915.

== Eggshell ==
Eggshell
#F0EAD6

Eggshell

Color coordinates
- Hex triplet: #F0EAD6
- sRGB^{B} (r, g, b): (240, 234, 214)
- HSV (h, s, v): (46°, 11%, 94%)
- CIELCh_{uv} (L, C, h): (93, 16, 74°)
- Source: ISCC-NBS
- ISCC–NBS descriptor: Pale yellow green
- B: Normalized to [0–255] (byte)

The color eggshell is displayed at left.

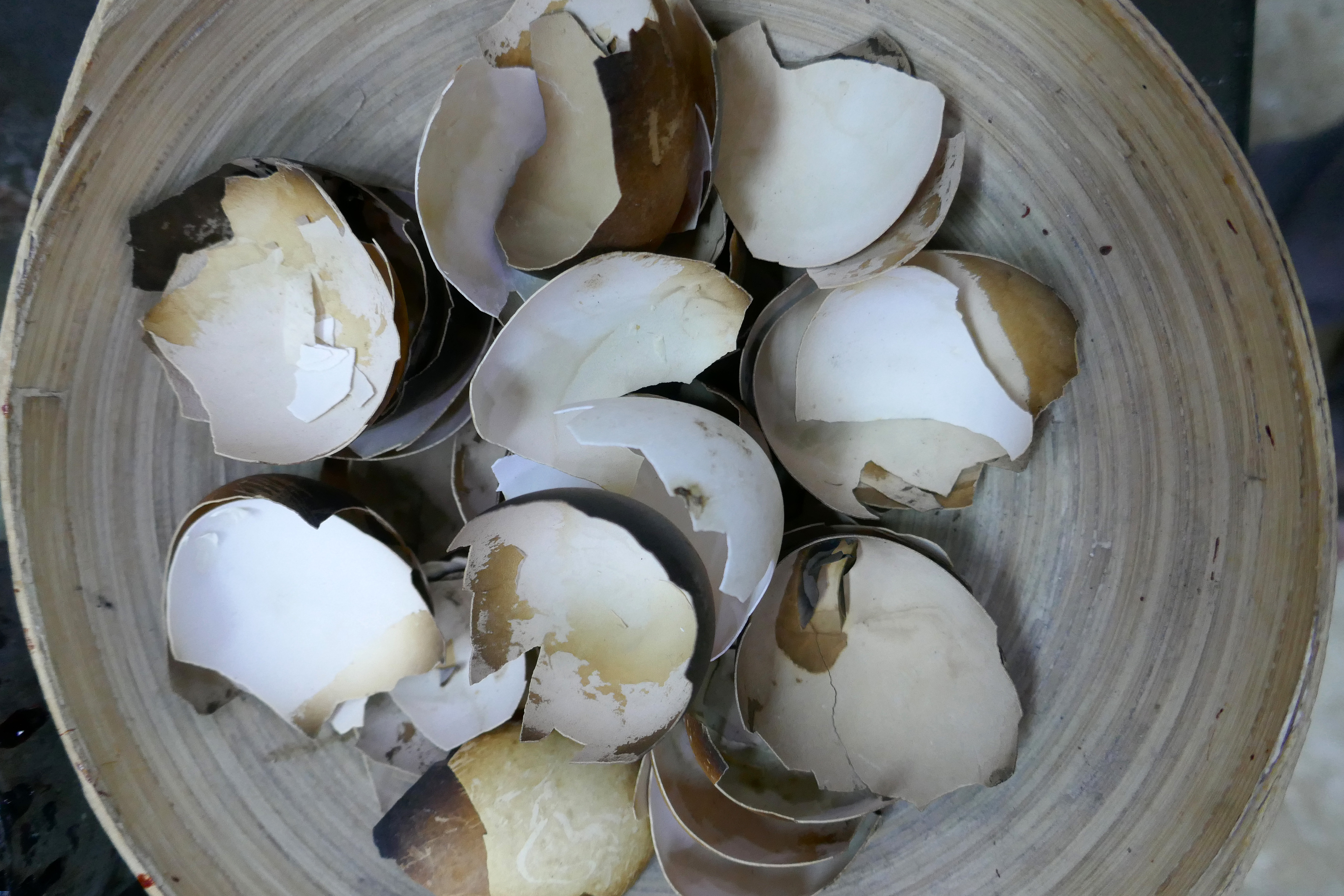
Broken egg shells

The color eggshell is a representation of the average color of chicken eggs.

== Dutch white ==
Dutch white
#EFDFBB

Dutch white

Color coordinates
- Hex triplet: #EFDFBB
- sRGB^{B} (r, g, b): (239, 223, 187)
- HSV (h, s, v): (42°, 22%, 94%)
- CIELCh_{uv} (L, C, h): (89, 31, 67°)
- Source: Resene
- ISCC–NBS descriptor: Pale yellow
- B: Normalized to [0–255] (byte)

Displayed at left is the color Dutch white.

Dutch white is one of the colors on the Resene Color List, a color list popular in Australia and New Zealand. The color Dutch white was formulated in 2000.

== Bone ==
Bone
#E3DAC9

Bone

Color coordinates
- Hex triplet: #E3DAC9
- sRGB^{B} (r, g, b): (227, 218, 201)
- HSV (h, s, v): (39°, 11%, 89%)
- CIELCh_{uv} (L, C, h): (87, 15, 66°)
- Source: Kelly-Moore
- ISCC–NBS descriptor: Yellowish gray
- B: Normalized to [0–255] (byte)

The color bone is displayed at left. This color is a representation of the color of bones.

The first recorded use of bone as a color name in English was in the first decade of the 19th century (exact year uncertain).

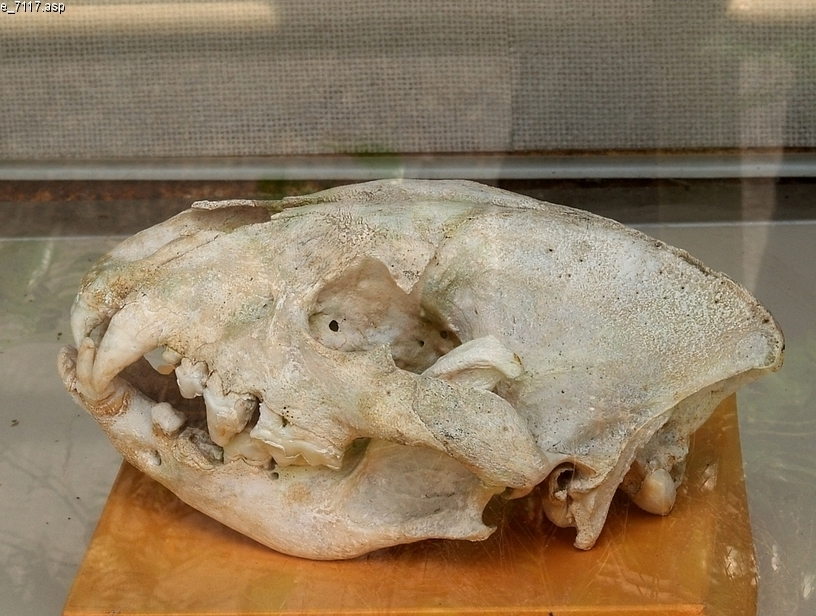
Cranial bones

== Vanilla ==
Vanilla
#F3E5AB

Vanilla

Color coordinates
- Hex triplet: #F3E5AB
- sRGB^{B} (r, g, b): (243, 229, 171)
- HSV (h, s, v): (48°, 30%, 95%)
- CIELCh_{uv} (L, C, h): (91, 44, 75°)
- Source: ISCC-NBS
- ISCC–NBS descriptor: Pale greenish yellow
- B: Normalized to [0–255] (byte)

The color vanilla is a rich tint of off-white as well as a medium pale tint of yellow.

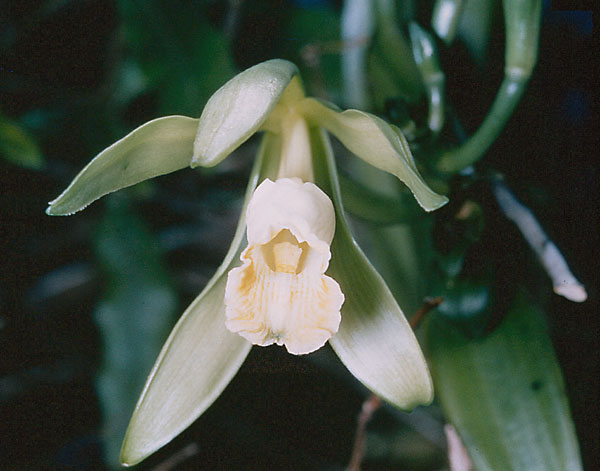
Vanilla orchid

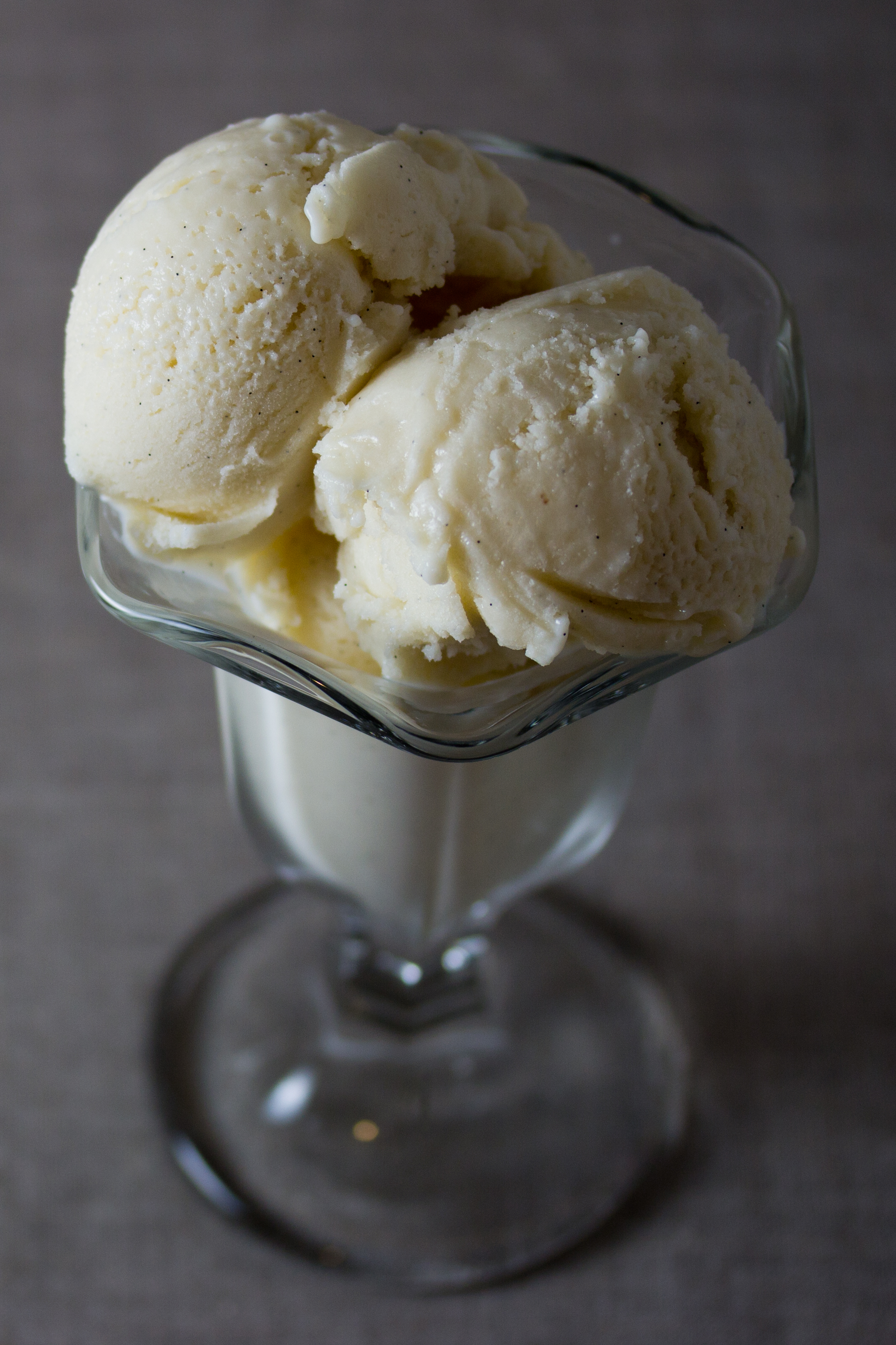
Vanilla ice cream

The first recorded use of vanilla as a color name in English was in 1925.

== Flax ==
Flax
#EEDC82

Flax

Color coordinates
- Hex triplet: #EEDC82
- sRGB^{B} (r, g, b): (238, 220, 130)
- HSV (h, s, v): (50°, 45%, 93%)
- CIELCh_{uv} (L, C, h): (87, 63, 75°)
- Source: Maerz and Paul
- ISCC–NBS descriptor: Light greenish yellow
- B: Normalized to [0–255] (byte)

The color flax is displayed at left.

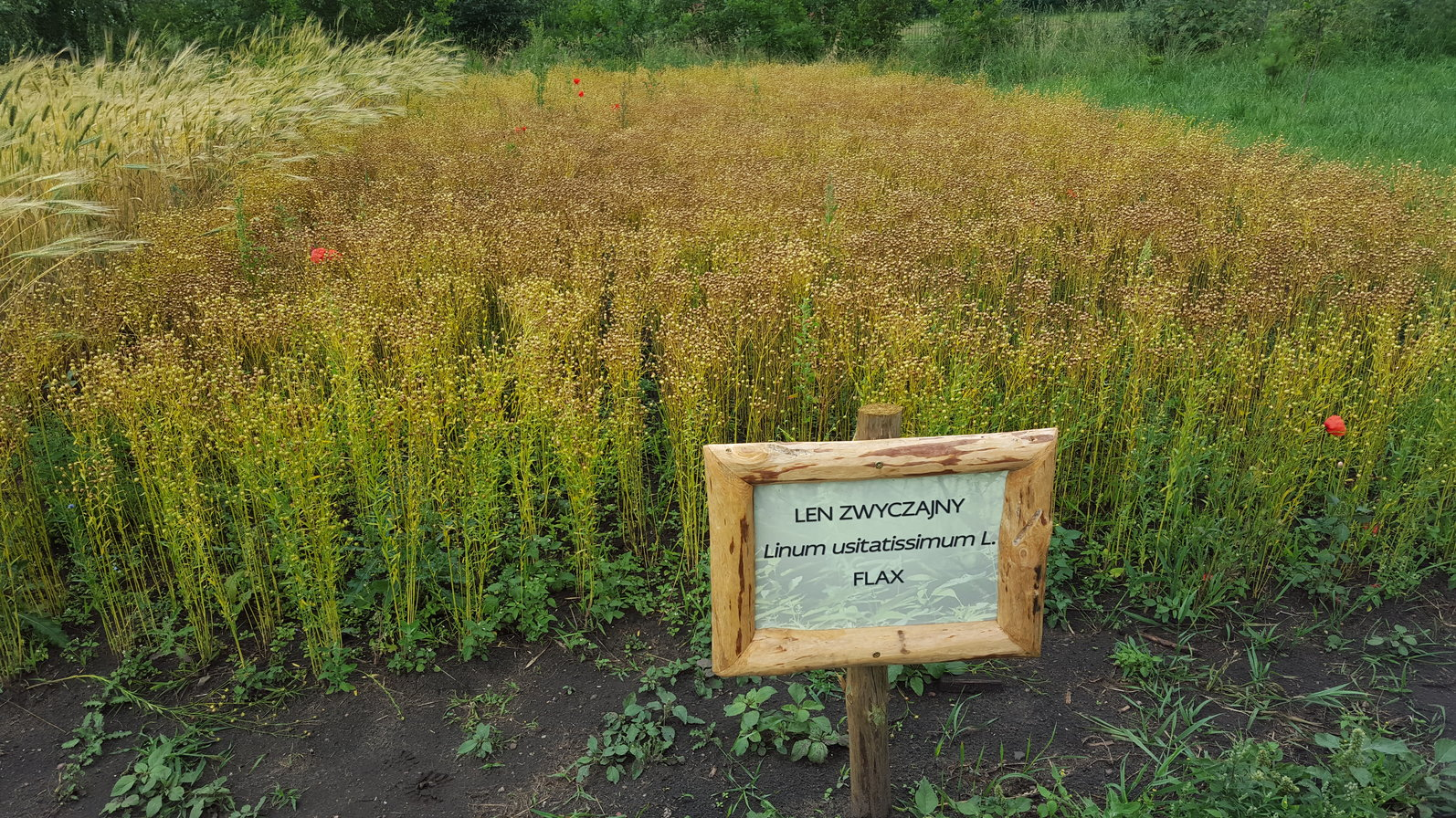
A patch of flax in Poland

The first recorded use of flax as a color name in English was in 1915.

== Navajo white ==
Navajo white
#FFDEAD

Navajo white

Color coordinates
- Hex triplet: #FFDEAD
- sRGB^{B} (r, g, b): (255, 222, 173)
- HSV (h, s, v): (36°, 32%, 100%)
- CIELCh_{uv} (L, C, h): (90, 45, 58°)
- Source: X11
- ISCC–NBS descriptor: Pale yellow
- B: Normalized to [0–255] (byte)

Navajo white is a whitish orange color, and derives its name from the Navajo Nation ethnic flag, a flag that uses this color. In 1987, Navajo white was included as one of the X11 colors.

== Alabaster ==
Alabaster
#EDEAE0

Displayed at left is the color alabaster. It represents the whitish color of the mineral alabaster.

Alabaster

Color coordinates
- Hex triplet: #EDEAE0
- sRGB^{B} (r, g, b): (237, 234, 224)
- HSV (h, s, v): (46°, 5%, 93%)
- CIELCh_{uv} (L, C, h): (93, 8, 74°)
- ISCC–NBS descriptor: Pale yellow green
- B: Normalized to [0–255] (byte)

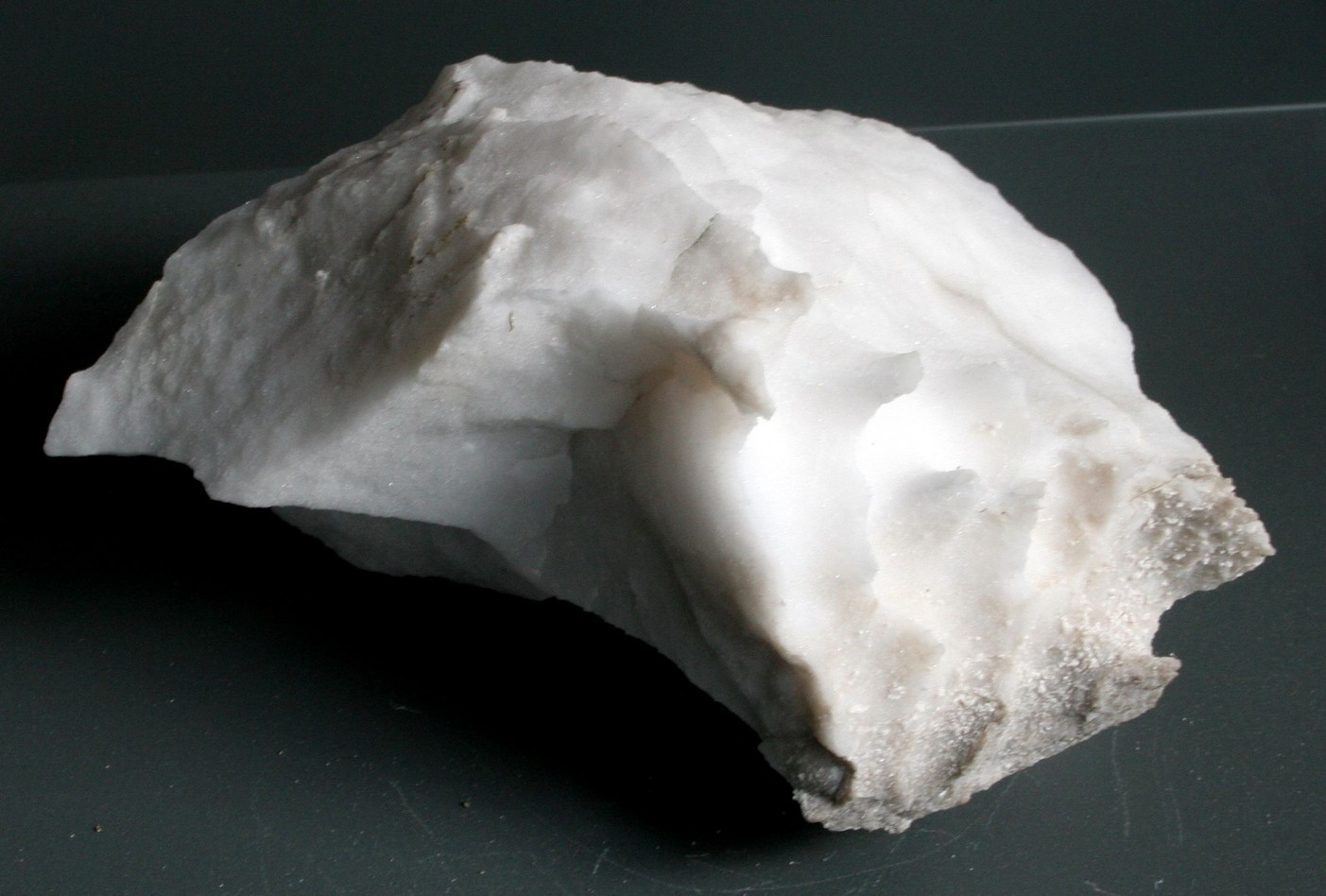
A slab of alabaster

Alabaster has been used as a color in English since 1594 (in Shakespeare's The Rape of Lucrece), but the origin of the RGB coordinates is not known.

== Linen ==
Linen
#FAF0E6

An X11 color, representing the whitish color of the linen cloth.

Linen

Color coordinates
- Hex triplet: #FAF0E6
- sRGB^{B} (r, g, b): (250, 240, 230)
- HSV (h, s, v): (30°, 8%, 98%)
- CIELCh_{uv} (L, C, h): (95, 11, 54°)
- Source: X11
- B: Normalized to [0–255] (byte)

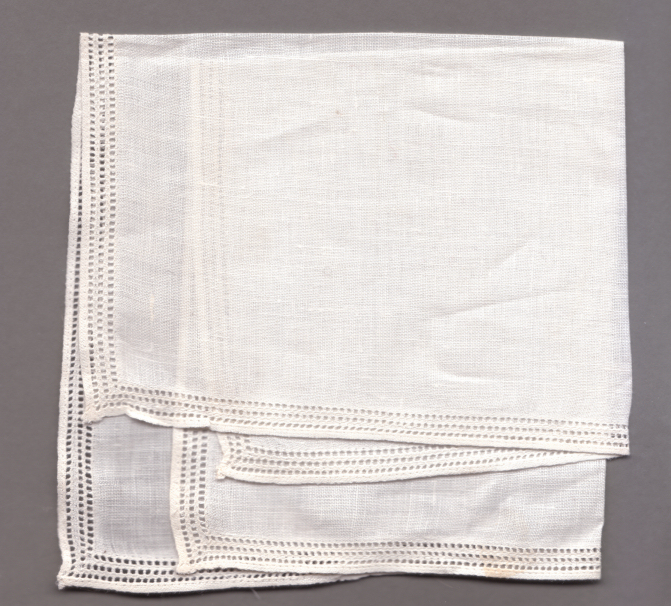
Linen handkerchief

== See also ==
- Beige
- Lists of colors
- Shades of black
- Shades of gray
