= Eggshell (color) =

Color

Color coordinates
- Hex triplet: #F0EAD6
- sRGB^{B} (r, g, b): (240, 234, 214)
- HSV (h, s, v): (46°, 11%, 94%)
- CIELCh_{uv} (L, C, h): (93, 16, 74°)
- Source: ISCC-NBS
- ISCC–NBS descriptor: Pale yellow green
- B: Normalized to [0–255] (byte)

The color eggshell is meant as a representation of the average color of a chicken egg.

In interior design, the color eggshell is commonly used when one desires a pale, warm, neutral, off-white color.

== Paint gloss ==
Eggshell paint also refers to a type of hard-wearing wall paint with the same matte sheen as an egg's shell, rather than the same color; consequently eggshell paint can be any color, not just off-white.

== See also ==
- List of colors
- Robin egg blue, also known as eggshell blue
