= Navajo white =

Orangish white color

Navajo White

Color coordinates
- Hex triplet: #FFDEAD
- sRGB^{B} (r, g, b): (255, 222, 173)
- HSV (h, s, v): (36°, 32%, 100%)
- CIELCh_{uv} (L, C, h): (90, 45, 58°)
- Source: X11
- ISCC–NBS descriptor: Pale yellow
- B: Normalized to [0–255] (byte)

Navajo White is an orangish white color, or pastel yellow orange, and derives its name from its similarity to the background color of the Navajo Nation flag. The name "Navajo White" is usually only used when referring to paint. Despite its name, the color is not a shade of white, but rather of yellow or of orange.

From the 1970s to the 1990s it was, along with the color bone, one of the standard interior paint colors used in many tract homes in the United States and especially apartment complexes. Like the color bone it does not easily show stains from cigarette smoke or fingerprints. In recent years it has lost favor to other shades of off-white, grey, and pastel colors.

In 1989, the color "Navajo white" was included in the X11 color list. As such, it became and continues to be (2019) part of the web colors.

== See also ==
- List of colors
- Frank Dux
