= Brown =

Color

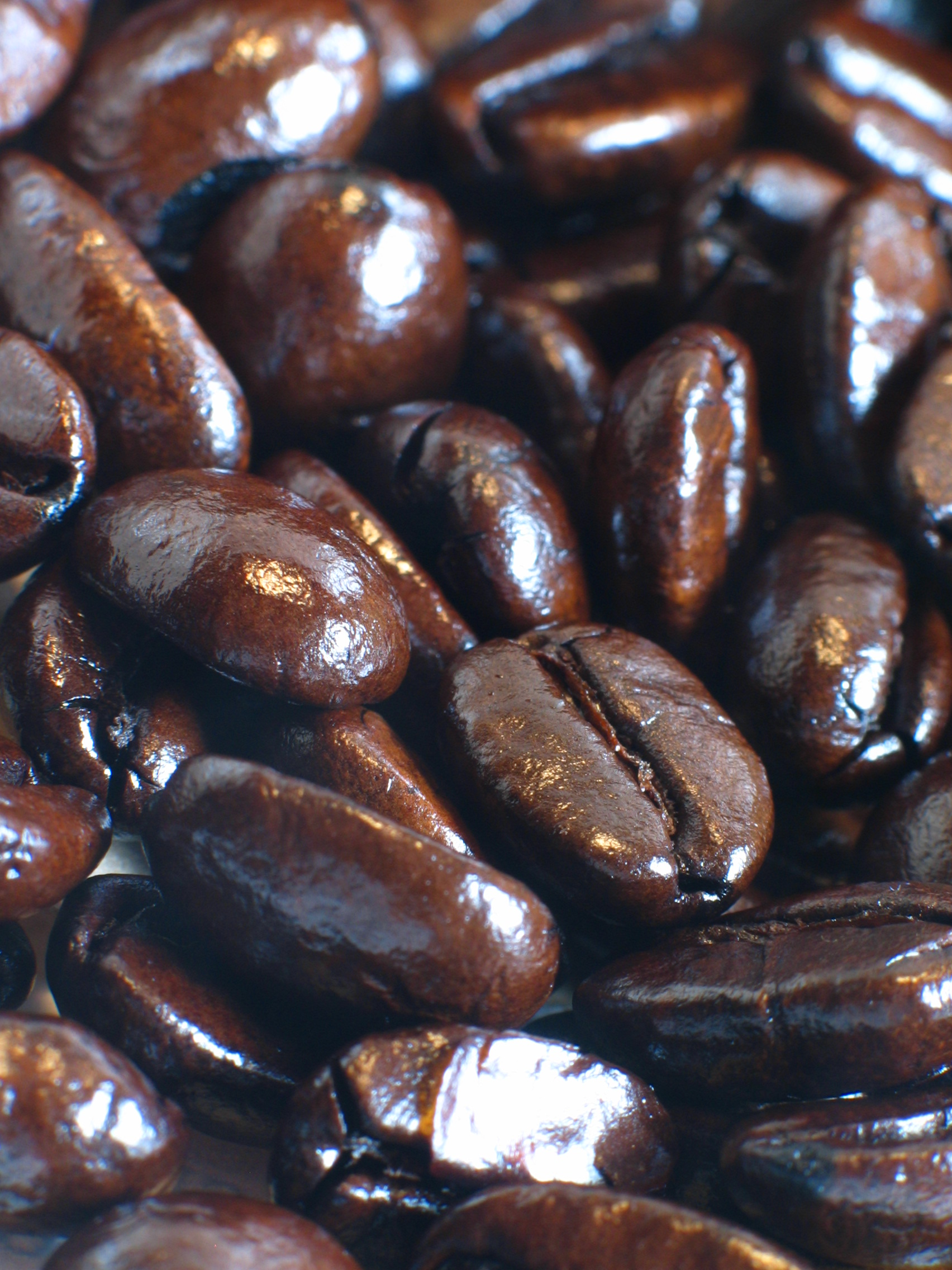
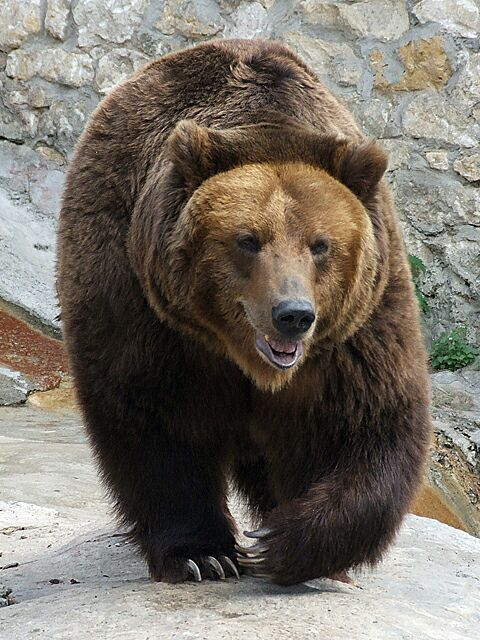
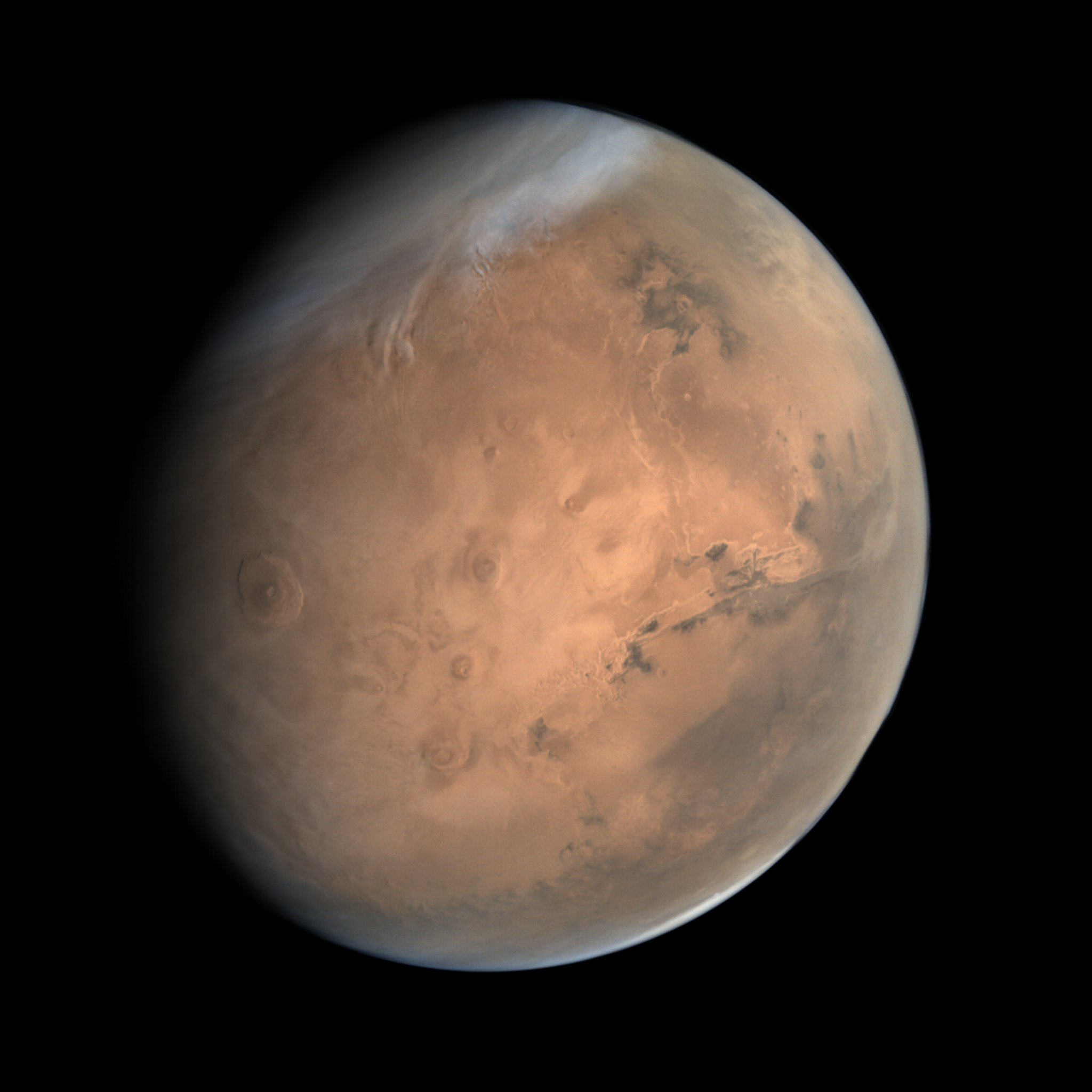
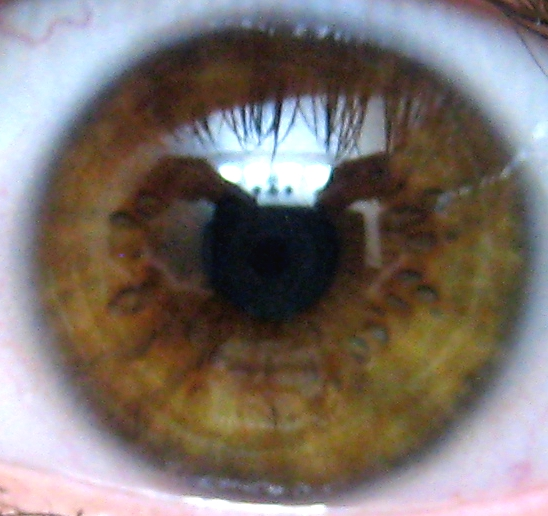
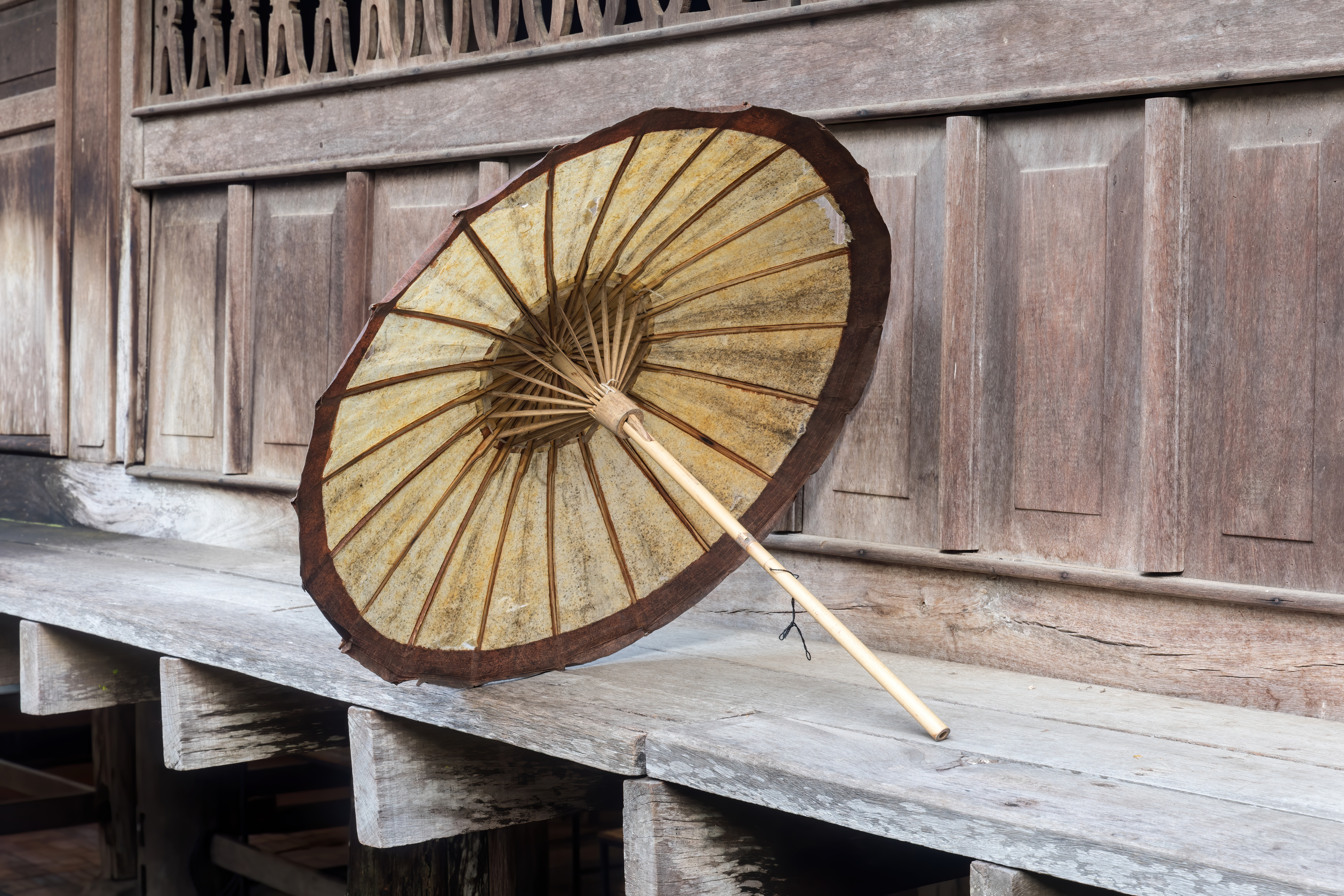
- Clockwise, from top left: Dark brown roasted coffee beans, brown bear (Moscow Zoo), amber brown iris of an eye, brown oil-paper umbrella against brown wooden house (Luang Prabang, Laos), the planet Mars.

Color coordinates
- Hex triplet: #964B00
- sRGB^{B} (r, g, b): (150, 75, 0)
- HSV (h, s, v): (30°, 100%, 59%)
- CIELCh_{uv} (L, C, h): (40, 72, 31°)
- Source: CSS Colour Module Level 3
- B: Normalized to [0–255] (byte)

Brown is a color. It can be thought as a darker, typically desaturated shade of orange, and can often be produced by combining red and yellow with another color, namely blue.

In the RGB color model used to project colors onto television screens and computer monitors, brown is created by mixing the three primary colors: red, yellow, and blue. Specifically, red light is emitted at medium to low intensity, green light at a lower intensity, and blue light with the lowest presence in most shades of the color. In the CMYK color model used in printing and painting, brown is usually made by combining yellow ink with smaller amounts of magenta and black inks.

The color brown is strongly associated with, and seen widely within, the natural world. Elements of the environment such as minerals, soil and wood are frequently brown in color; consequently, many animals have brown pelts, scales or feathers in order to better camouflage themselves within their habitats. Likewise, brown is often seen in the biology of humans; brown hair, eye color and skin pigmentation are commonplace among humankind. The color is also frequently seen in plant-derived materials such as plant fibers, bark, fruits, nuts, and seeds.

== Etymology ==
The term is from Old English brún, in origin for any dusky or dark shade of color. The first recorded use of brown as a color name in English was in 1000. The Common Germanic adjectives *brûnoz and *brûnâ meant both dark colors and a glistening or shining quality, whence burnish. The current meaning developed in Middle English from the 14th century.

Words for the color brown around the world often come from foods or beverages; in the eastern Mediterranean, the word for brown often comes from the color of coffee: in Turkish, the word for brown is kahverengi; in Greek, kafé. In Portuguese, Spanish and French, the word for brown or for a specific shade of brown is derived from the word for chestnut (castanea in Latin). In Southeast Asia, the color name for brown often comes from the word for chocolate: coklat in Malay and tsokolate in Filipino. In Japan, the word chairo means the color of tea.

== History and art ==
=== Ancient history ===
Brown has been used in art since prehistoric times. Paintings using umber, a natural clay pigment composed of iron oxide and manganese oxide, have been dated to 40,000 BC. Paintings of brown horses and other animals have been found on the walls of the Lascaux cave dating back about 17,300 years. The female figures in ancient Egyptian tomb paintings have brown skin, painted with umber. Light tan was often used on painted Greek amphorae and vases, either as a background for black figures, or the reverse.

The Ancient Greeks and Romans produced a fine reddish-brown ink, of a color called sepia, made from the ink of a variety of cuttlefish. This ink was used by Leonardo da Vinci, Raphael and other artists during the Renaissance, and by artists up until the present time.

In Ancient Rome, brown clothing was associated with the lower classes or barbarians. The term for the plebeians, or urban poor, was "pullati", which meant literally "those dressed in brown".

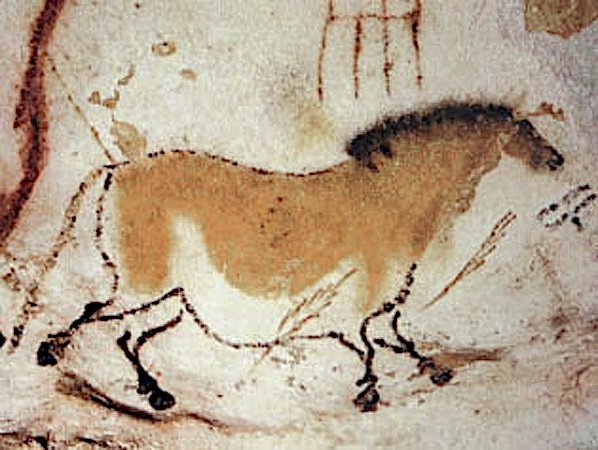
Painting of a dun horse on the wall of Lascaux Cave in France

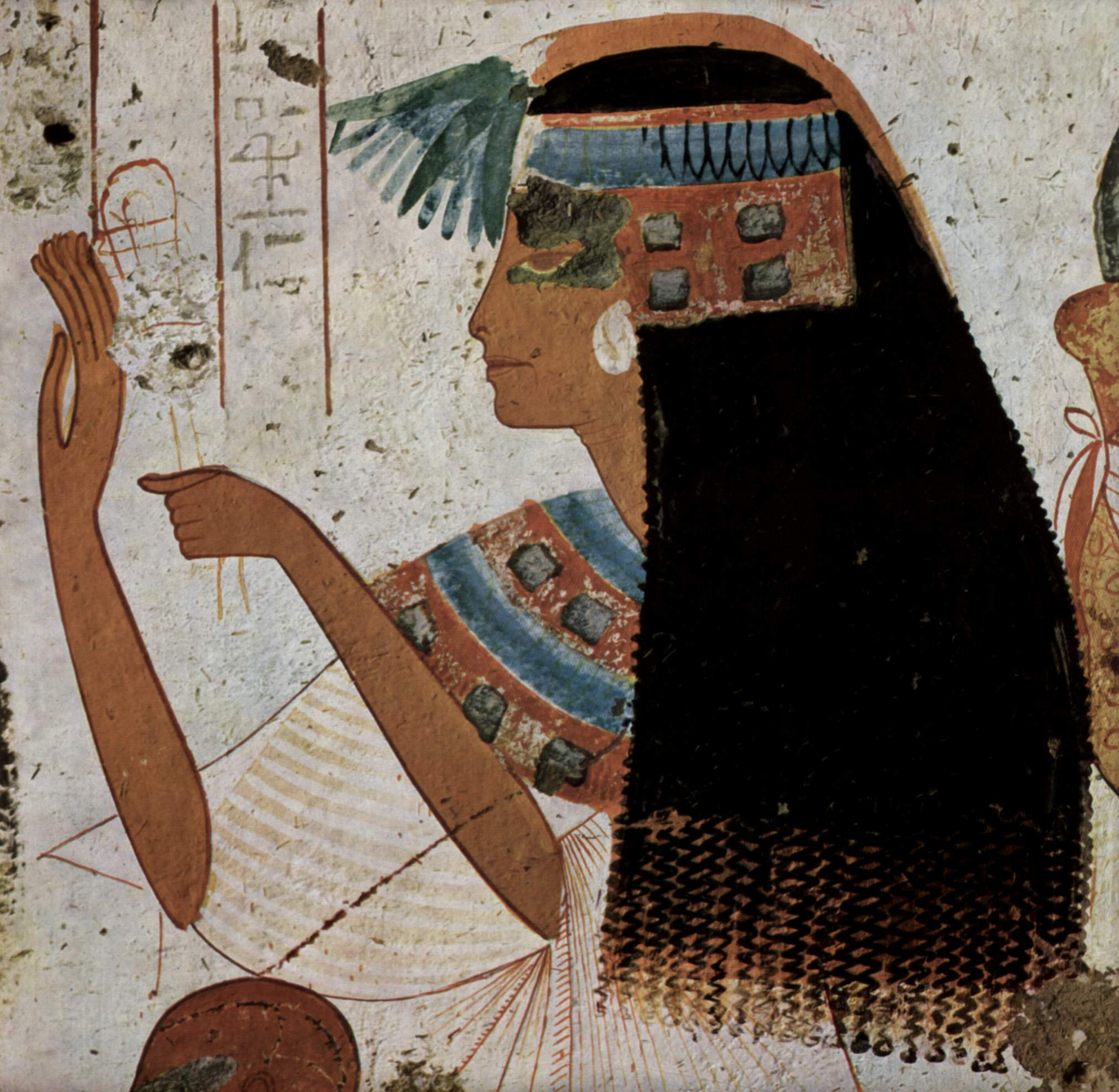
Tomb of Userhet, 1300 BC. Brown was widely used in Ancient Egypt to represent skin color.

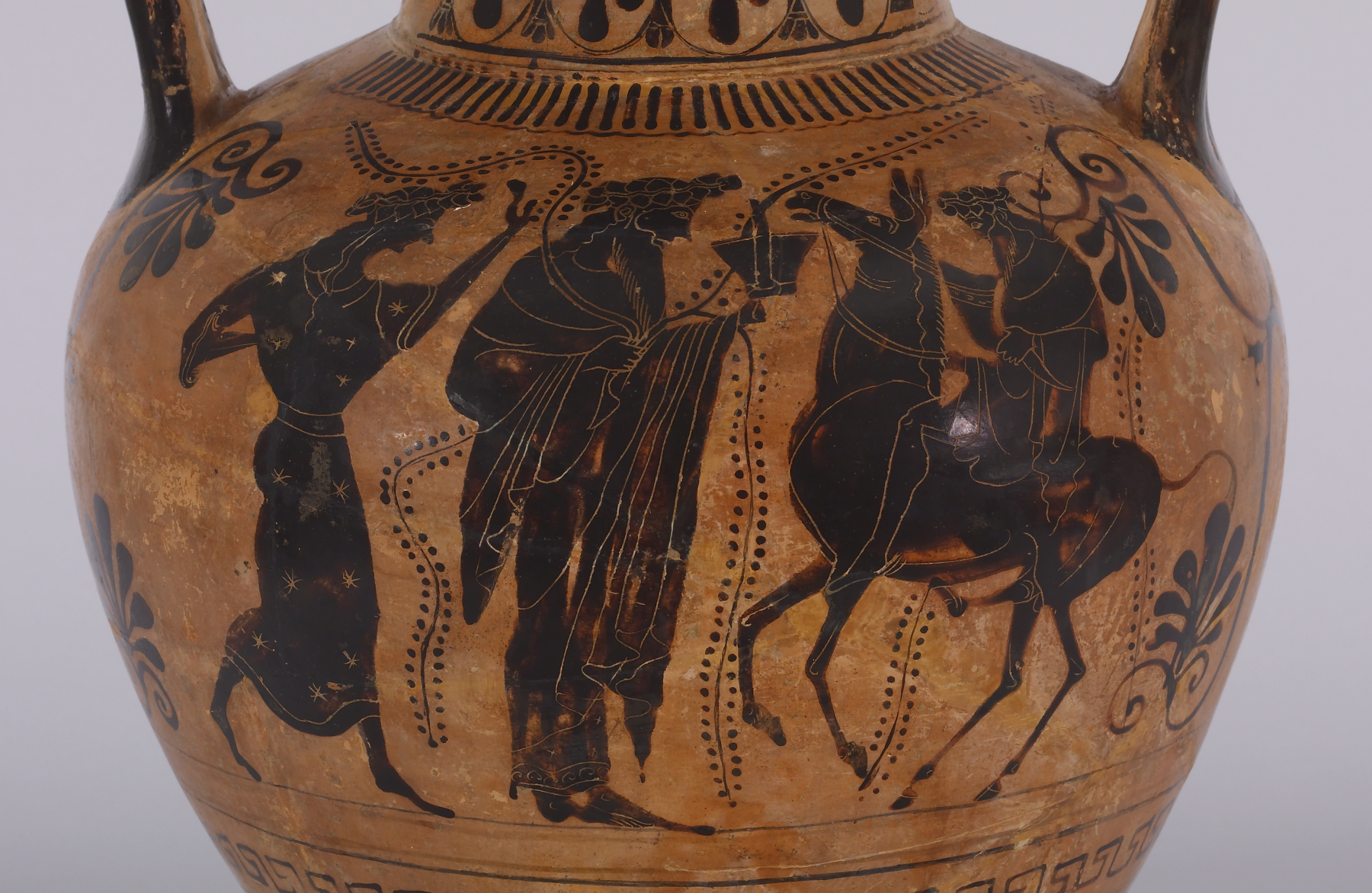
A tan terracotta background on a Greek amphora with the figures of Hercules and Apollo. (about 720 BC)

=== Post-classical history ===
In the Middle Ages brown robes were worn by monks of the Franciscan order, as a sign of their humility and poverty. Each social class was expected to wear a color suitable to their station; and grey and brown were the colors of the poor. Russet was a coarse homespun cloth made of wool and dyed with woad and madder to give it a subdued grey or brown shade. By the statute of 1363, poor English people were required to wear russet. The medieval poem Piers Plowman describes the virtuous Christian:

And is gladde of a goune of a graye russet
As of a tunicle of Tarse or of trye scarlet.

In the Middle Ages, dark brown pigments were rarely used in art; painters and book illuminators artists of that period preferred bright, distinct colors such as red, blue and green rather than dark colors. The umbers were not widely used in Europe before the end of the fifteenth century; The Renaissance painter and writer Giorgio Vasari (1511–1574) described them as being rather new in his time.

Artists began using far greater use of browns when oil painting arrived in the late fifteenth century. During the Renaissance, artists generally used four different browns; raw umber, the dark brown clay mined from the earth around Umbria, in Italy; raw sienna, a reddish-brown earth mined near Siena, in Tuscany; burnt umber, the Umbrian clay heated until it turned a darker shade, and burnt sienna, heated until it turned a dark reddish brown. In Northern Europe, Jan van Eyck featured rich earth browns in his portraits to set off the brighter colors.

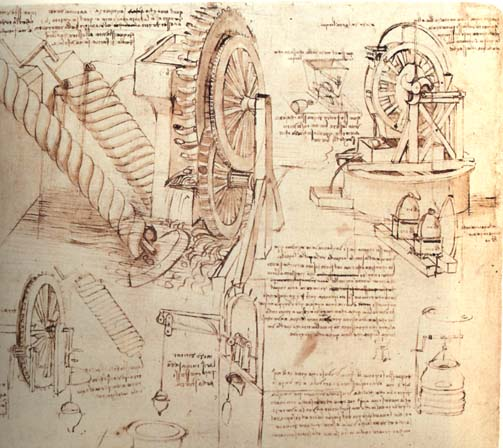
Leonardo da Vinci used sepia ink, from cuttlefish, for his writing and drawing

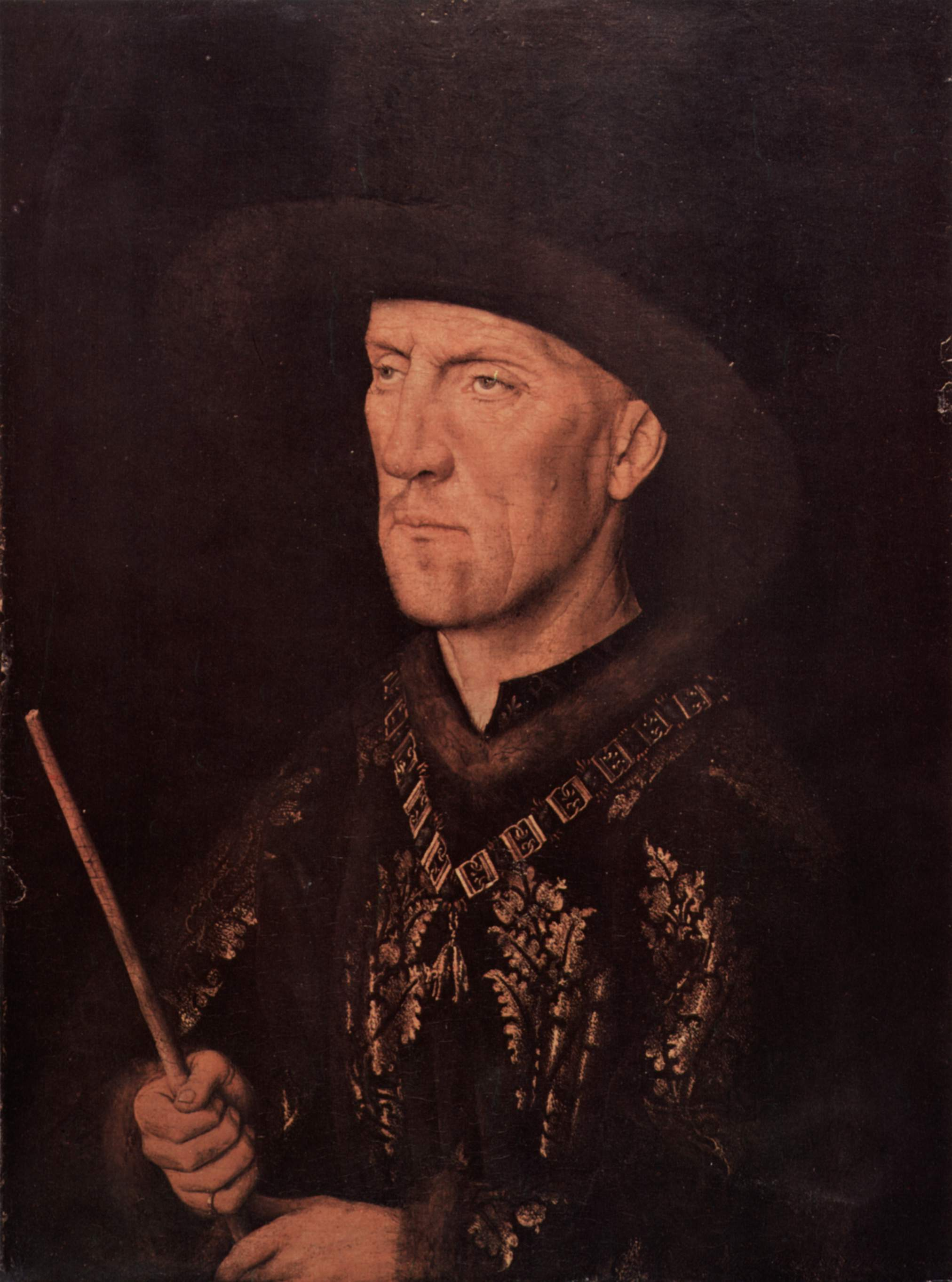
Jan van Eyck, Portrait de Baudoin de Lannoy (1435)

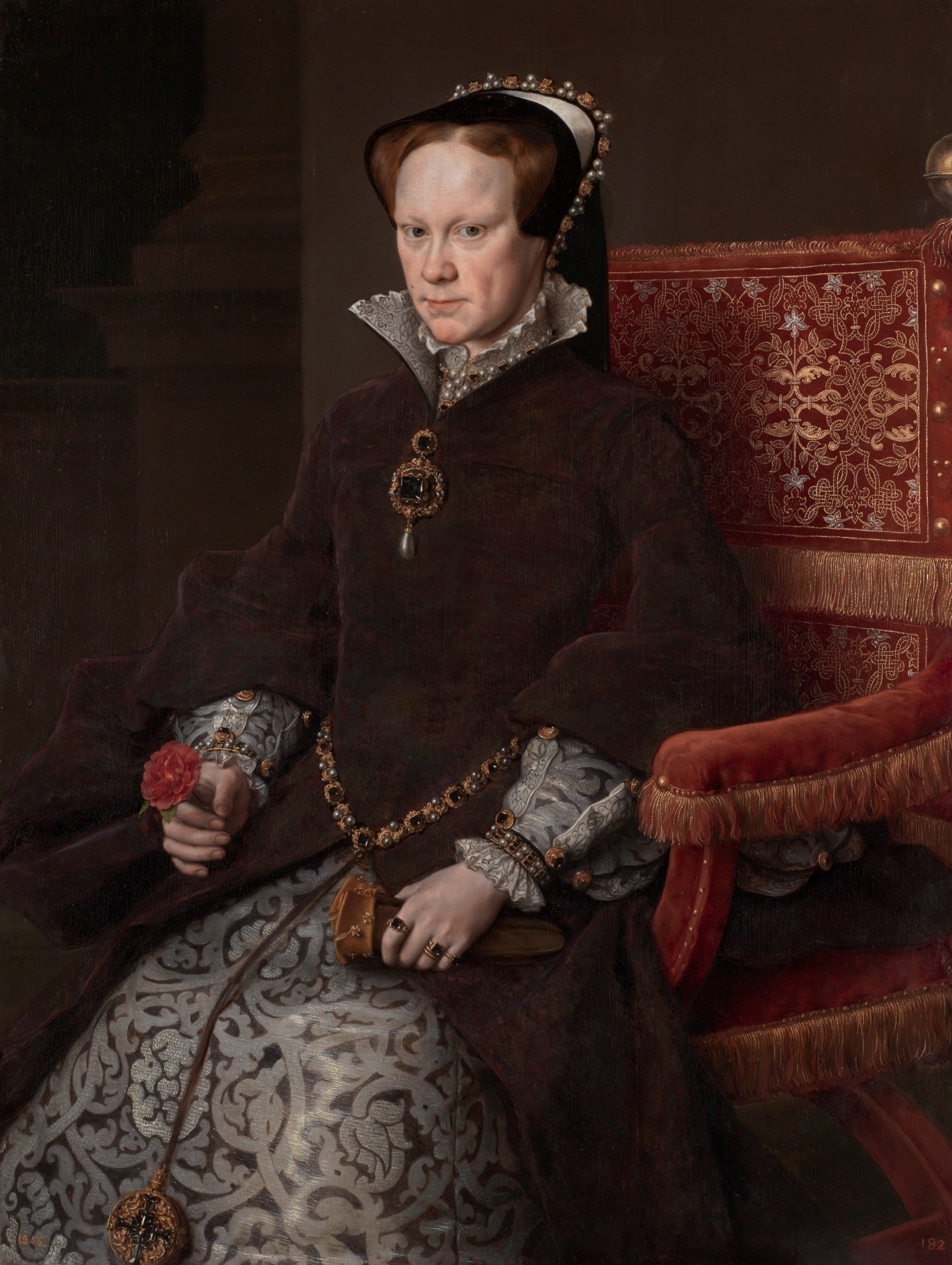
Mary I of England (1554)

=== Modern history ===
==== 17th and 18th century ====
The 17th and 18th century saw the greatest use of brown. Caravaggio and Rembrandt Van Rijn used browns to create chiaroscuro effects, where the subject appeared out of the darkness. Rembrandt also added umber to the ground layers of his paintings because it promoted faster drying. Rembrandt also began to use new brown pigment, called Cassel earth or Cologne earth. This was a natural earth color composed of over ninety percent organic matter, such as soil and peat. It was used by Rubens and Anthony van Dyck, and later became commonly known as Van Dyck brown.

Self-portrait of Rembrandt. The older Rembrandt became the more brown he used in his paintings.

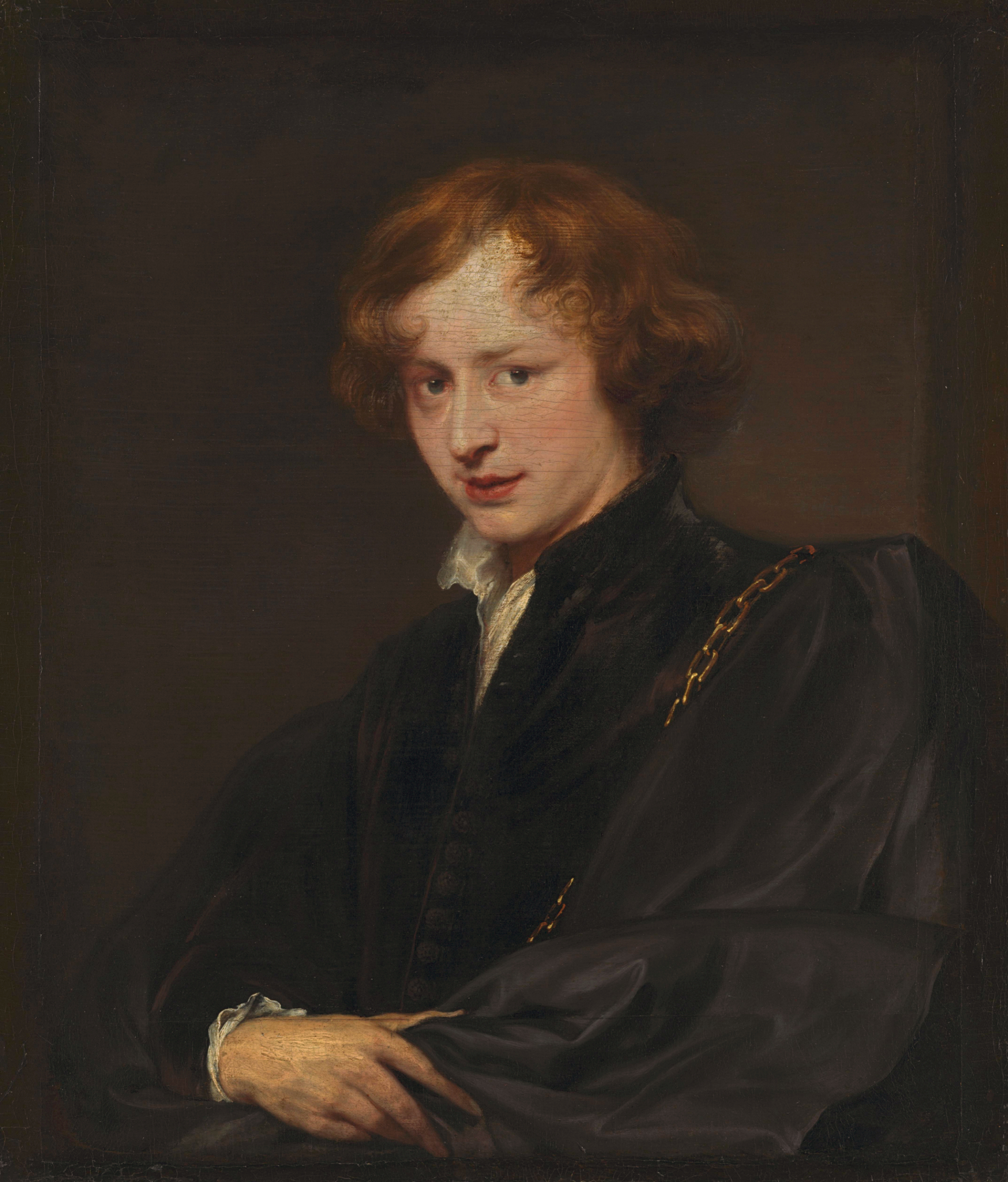
Anthony van Dyck, like Rembrandt, was attached to the pigment called Cassel earth or Cologne earth; it became known as Van Dyck brown

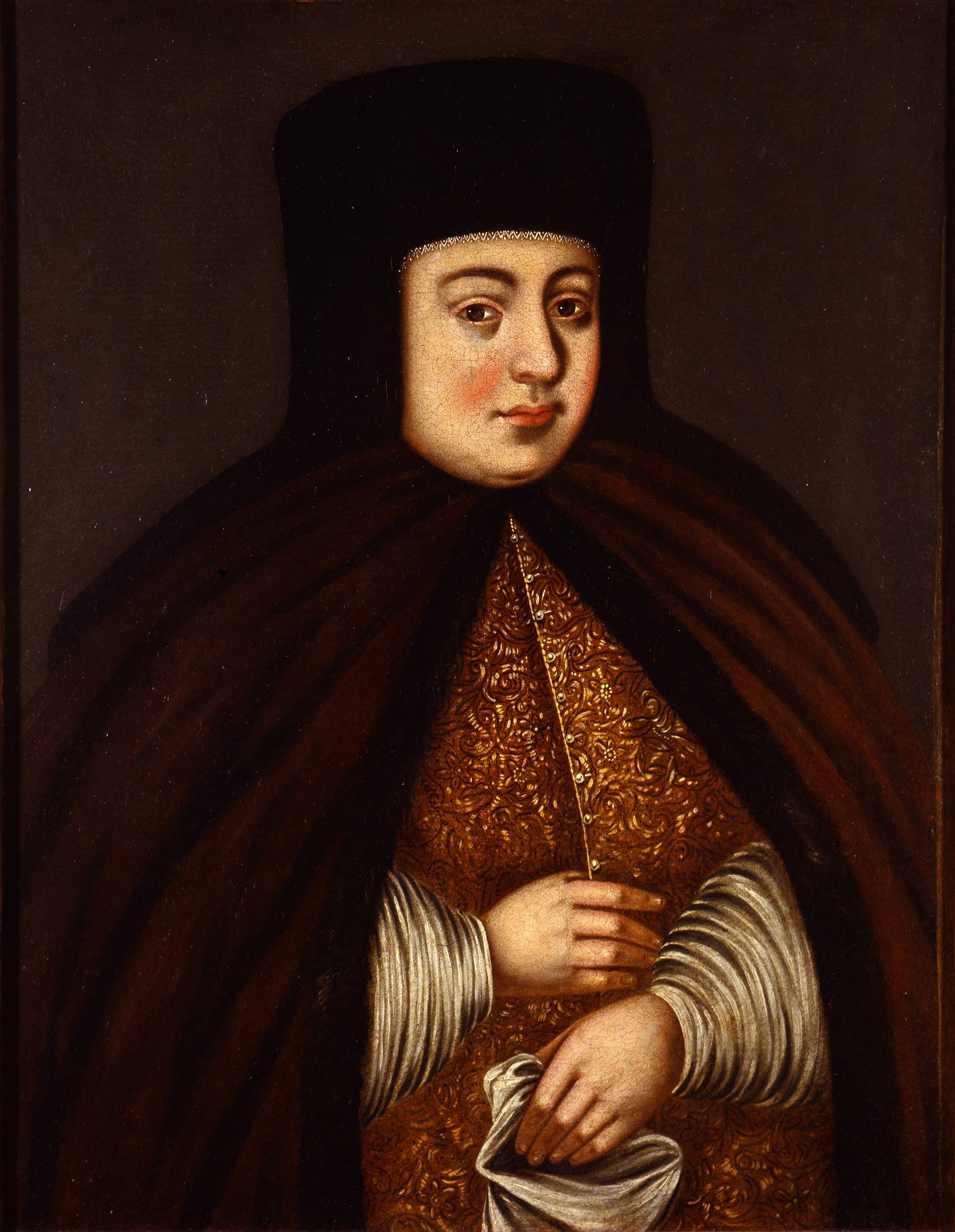
Natalya Naryshkina, Tsaritsa of Russia (late 17th century)

==== 19th and 20th century ====
Brown was generally hated by the French impressionists, who preferred bright, pure colors. The exception among French 19th-century artists was Paul Gauguin, who created luminous brown portraits of the people and landscapes of French Polynesia.

In the late 20th century, brown became a common symbol in western culture for simple, inexpensive, natural and healthy. Bag lunches were carried in plain brown paper bags; packages were wrapped in plain brown paper. Brown bread and brown sugar were viewed as more natural and healthy than white bread and white sugar.

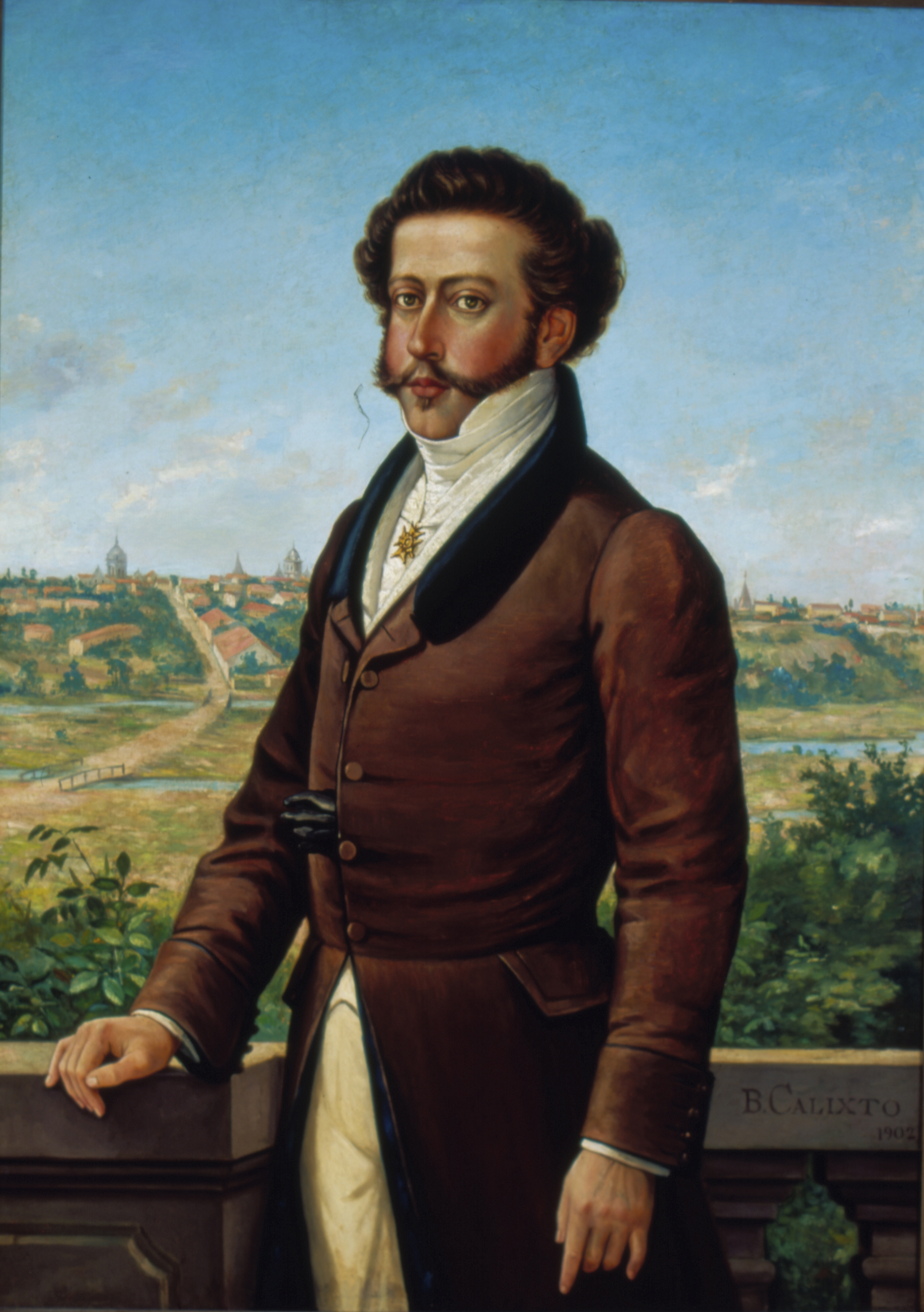
Pedro of Braganza, Prince Royal of Portugal and Brazil (later Emperor of Brazil as Pedro I and King of Portugal as Pedro IV), by Benedito Calixto (1822)

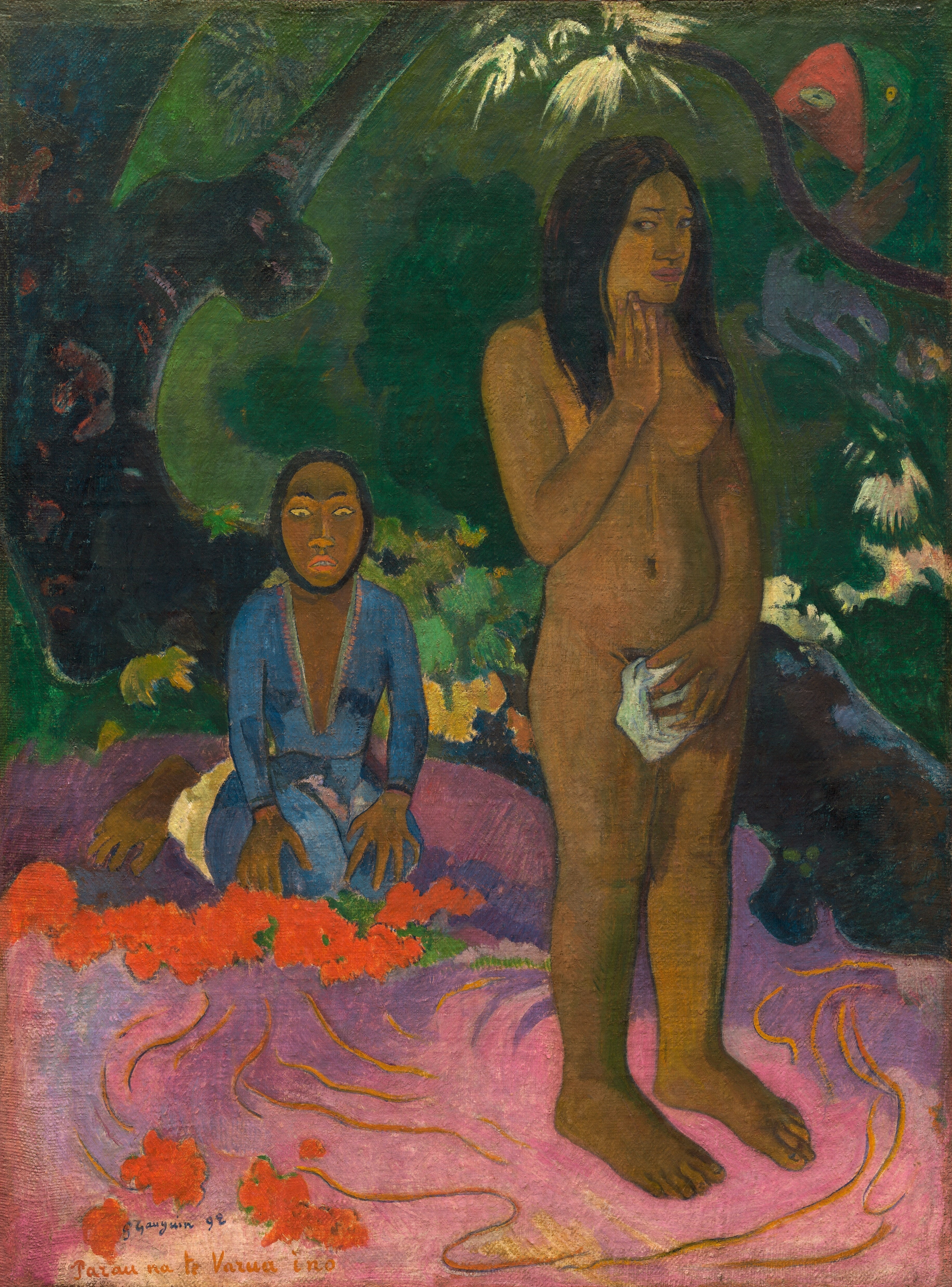
Words of the Devil, by Paul Gauguin (1892)

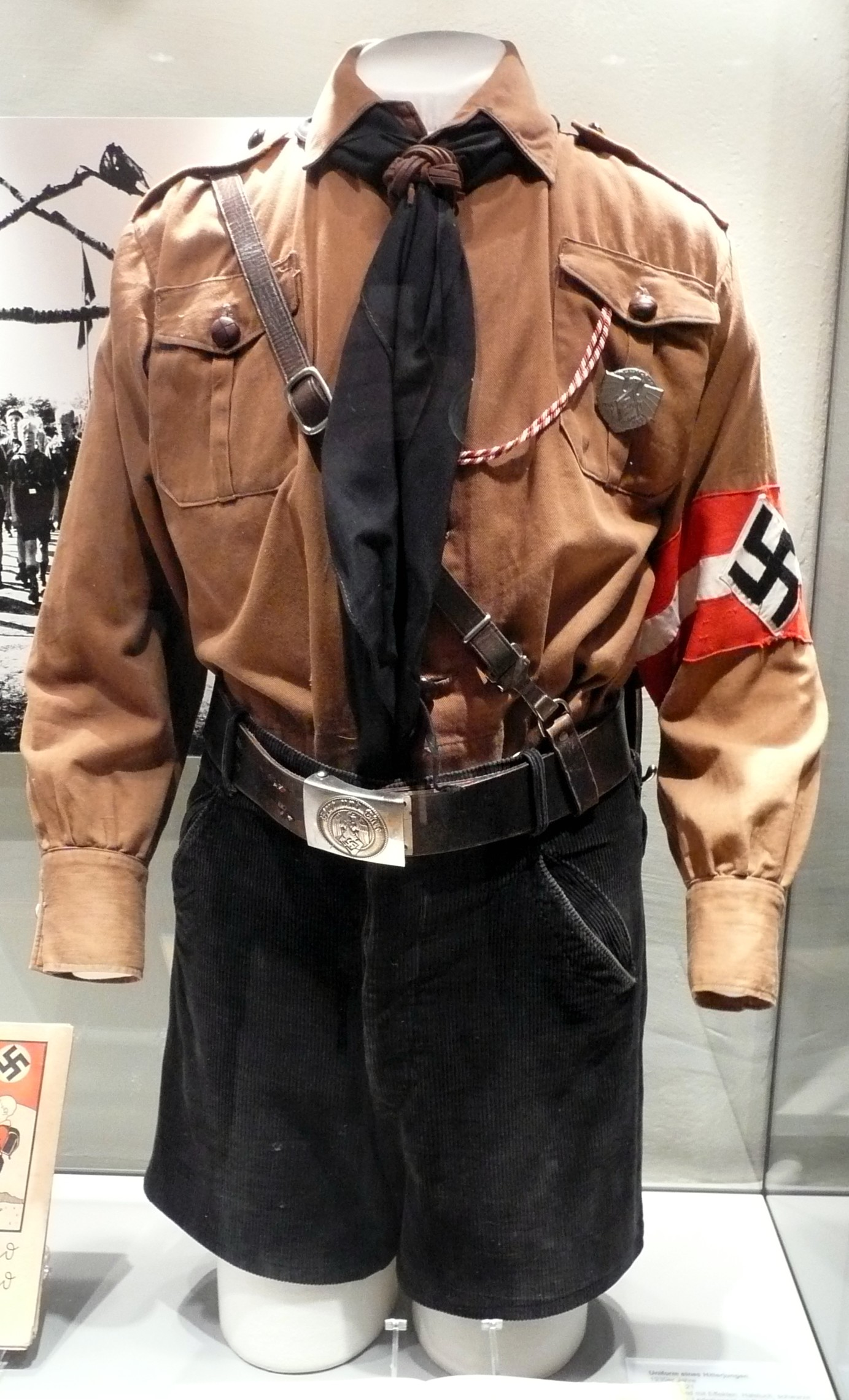
Uniform of the Hitler Youth movement in the 1930s

== Brown in science and nature ==
=== Optics ===
Brown is a dark orange color. It can be thought of as dark orange, but it can also be made in other ways. In the RGB color model, which uses red, green and blue light in various combinations to make all the colors on computer and television screens, it is made by mixing red and green light.

In terms of the visible spectrum, "brown" refers to long wavelength hues, yellow, orange, or red, in combination with low luminance or saturation. Since brown may cover a wide range of the visible spectrum, composite adjectives are used such as red brown, yellowish brown, dark brown or light brown.

As a color of low intensity, brown is a tertiary color: a mix of the three subtractive primary colors is brown if the cyan content is low. Brown exists as a color perception only in the presence of a brighter color contrast. Yellow, orange, red, or rose objects are still perceived as such if the general illumination level is low, despite reflecting the same amount of red or orange light as a brown object would in normal lighting conditions.

The colored disks appear to be brown and orange, but are actually an identical shade; their perceived color depends on the shade of grey they are surrounded by

=== Brown pigments, dyes and inks ===
- Raw umber and burnt umber are two of the oldest pigments used by humans. Umber is a brown clay, containing a large amount of iron oxide and between five and twenty percent manganese oxide, which give the color. Its shade varies from a greenish brown to a dark brown. It takes its name from the Italian region of Umbria, where it was formerly mined. The principal source today is the island of Cyprus. Burnt umber is the same pigment which has been roasted (calcined), which turns the pigment darker and more reddish.
- Raw sienna and burnt sienna are also clay pigments rich in iron oxide, which were mined during the Renaissance around the city of Siena in Tuscany. Sienna contains less than five percent manganese. The natural sienna earth is a dark yellow ochre color; when roasted it becomes a rich reddish brown called burnt sienna.
- Mummy brown was a pigment used in oil paints made from ground Egyptian mummies.
- Caput mortuum is a haematite iron oxide pigment, used in painting. The name is also used in reference to mummy brown.
- Van Dyck brown, known in Europe as Cologne earth or Cassel earth, is another natural earth pigment, that was made up largely of decayed vegetal matter. It made a rich dark brown, and was widely used during the Renaissance to the 19th century. It takes its name from the painter Anthony van Dyck, but it was used by many other artists before him. It was highly unstable and unreliable, so its use was abandoned by the 20th century, though the name continues to be used for modern synthetic pigments. The color of Van Dyck brown can be recreated by mixing ivory black with mauve or with Venetian red, or mixing cadmium red with cobalt blue.
- Mars brown. The names of the earth colors are still used, but very few modern pigments with these names actually contain natural earths; most of their ingredients today are synthetic. Mars brown is typical of these new colors, made with synthetic iron oxide pigments. The new colors have a superior coloring power and opacity, but not the delicate hue as their namesakes.
- Walnuts have been used to make a brown dye since antiquity. The Roman writer Ovid, in the first century BC described how the Gauls used the juice of the hull or husk inside the shell of the walnut to make a brown dye for wool, or a reddish dye for their hair.
- The chestnut tree has also been used since ancient times as a source brown dye. The bark of the tree, the leaves and the husk of the nuts have all been used to make dye. The leaves were used to make a beige or yellowish-brown dye, and in the Ottoman Empire the yellow-brown from chestnut leaves was combined with indigo blue to make shades of green.
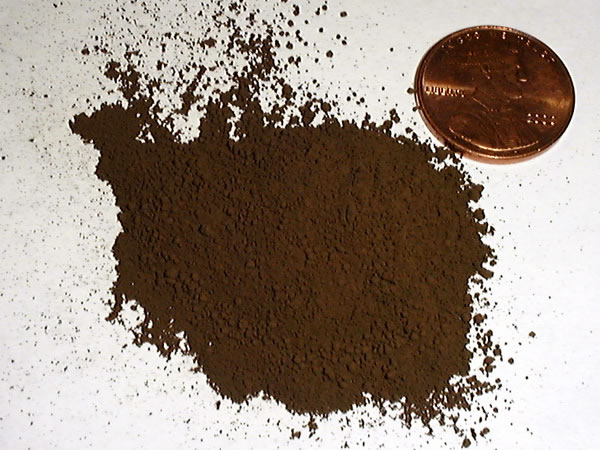
Iron oxide is the most common ingredient in brown pigments

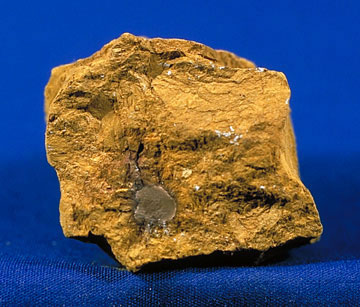
Limonite is a form of yellowish iron ore. A clay of limonite rich in iron oxide is the source of raw sienna and burnt sienna.

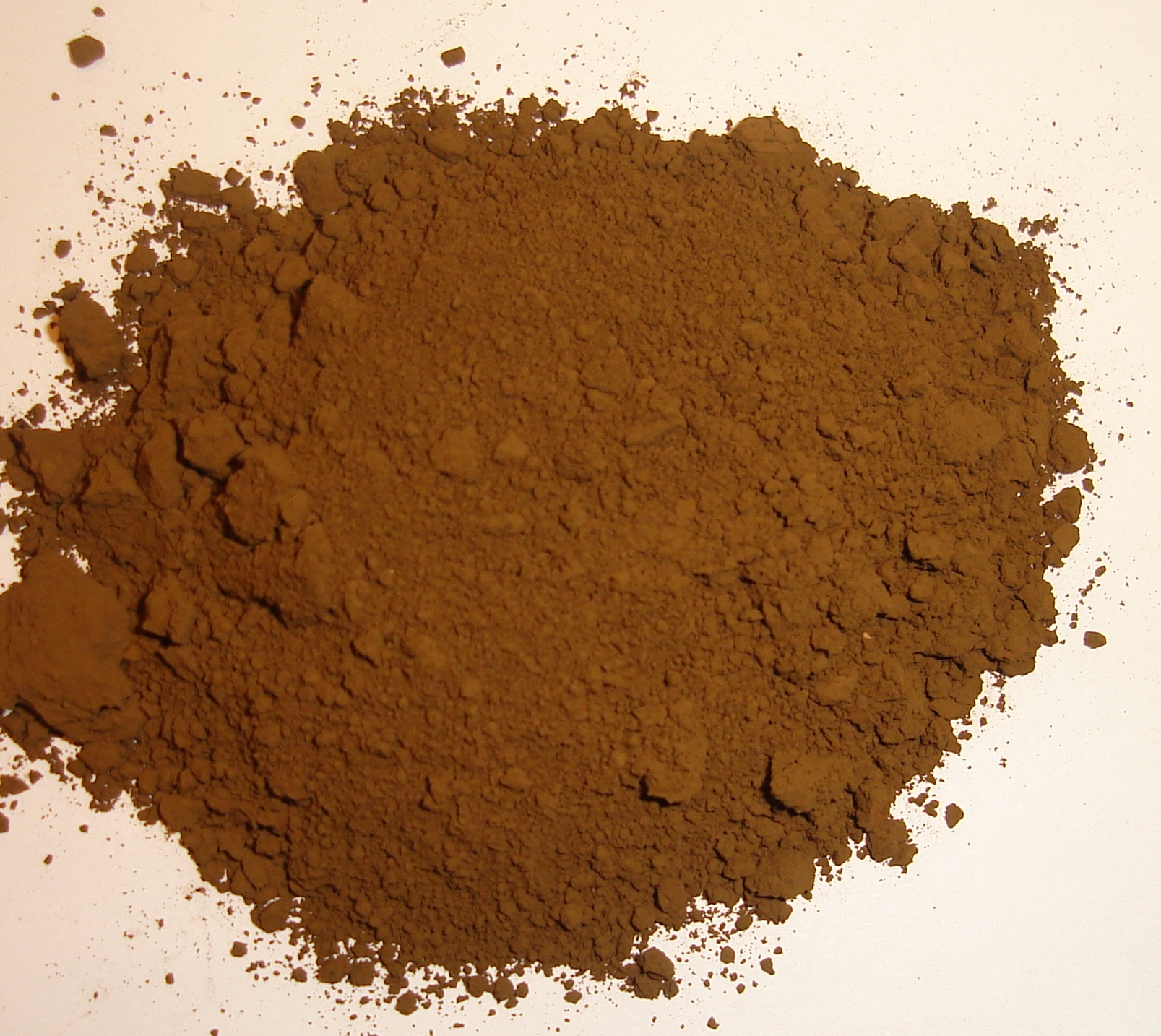
Natural or raw umber pigment is clay rich in iron oxide and manganese

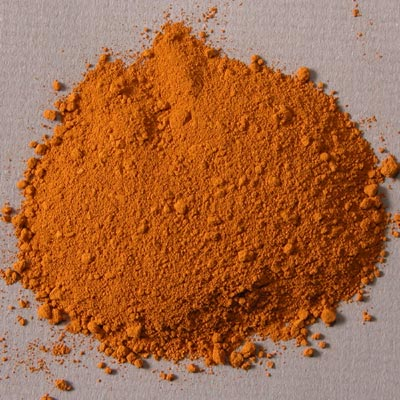
Burnt sienna pigment, from the region around Siena in Tuscany

=== Brown eyes ===
With few exceptions, all mammals have brown or darkly-pigmented irises. In humans, brown eyes result from a relatively high concentration of melanin in the stroma of the iris, which causes light of both shorter and longer wavelengths to be absorbed and in many parts of the world, it is nearly the only iris color present. Dark pigment of brown eyes is most common in East Asia, Central Asia, Southeast Asia, South Asia, West Asia, Oceania, Africa, Americas, etc. as well as parts of Eastern Europe and Southern Europe. The majority of people in the world overall have dark brown eyes. Brown irises range from highly pigmented, dark brown (almost black) eyes, to very light, almost amber or hazel irises composed partially of lipochrome. Light or medium-pigmented brown eyes are common in Europe, Afghanistan, Pakistan and Northern India, as well as some parts of the Middle East, and can also be found in populations in East Asia and Southeast Asia, but are proportionally rare. (See eye color).

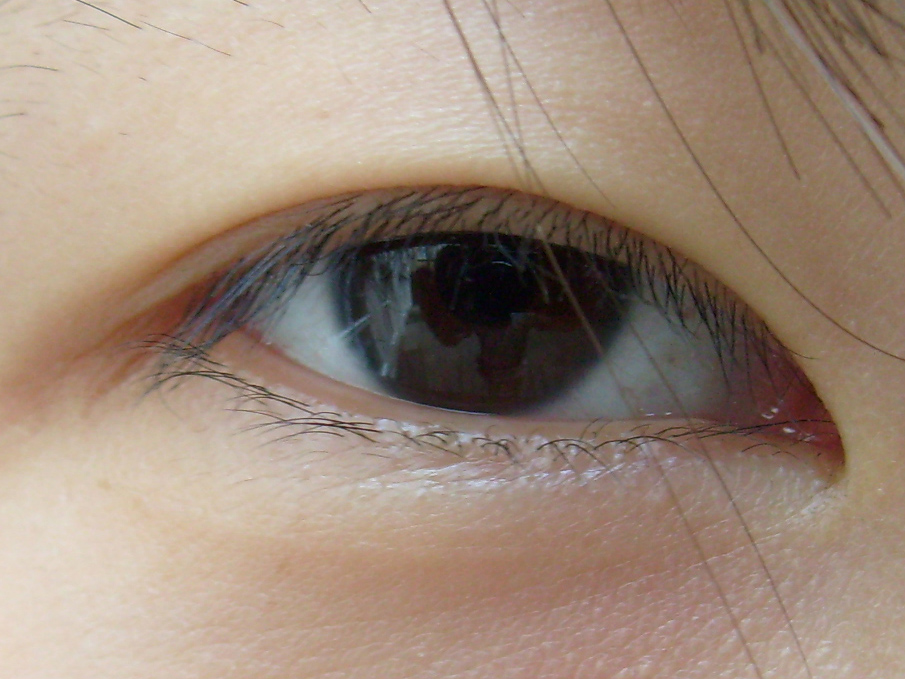
A dark brown iris is most common in East Asia, Southeast Asia, and South Asia

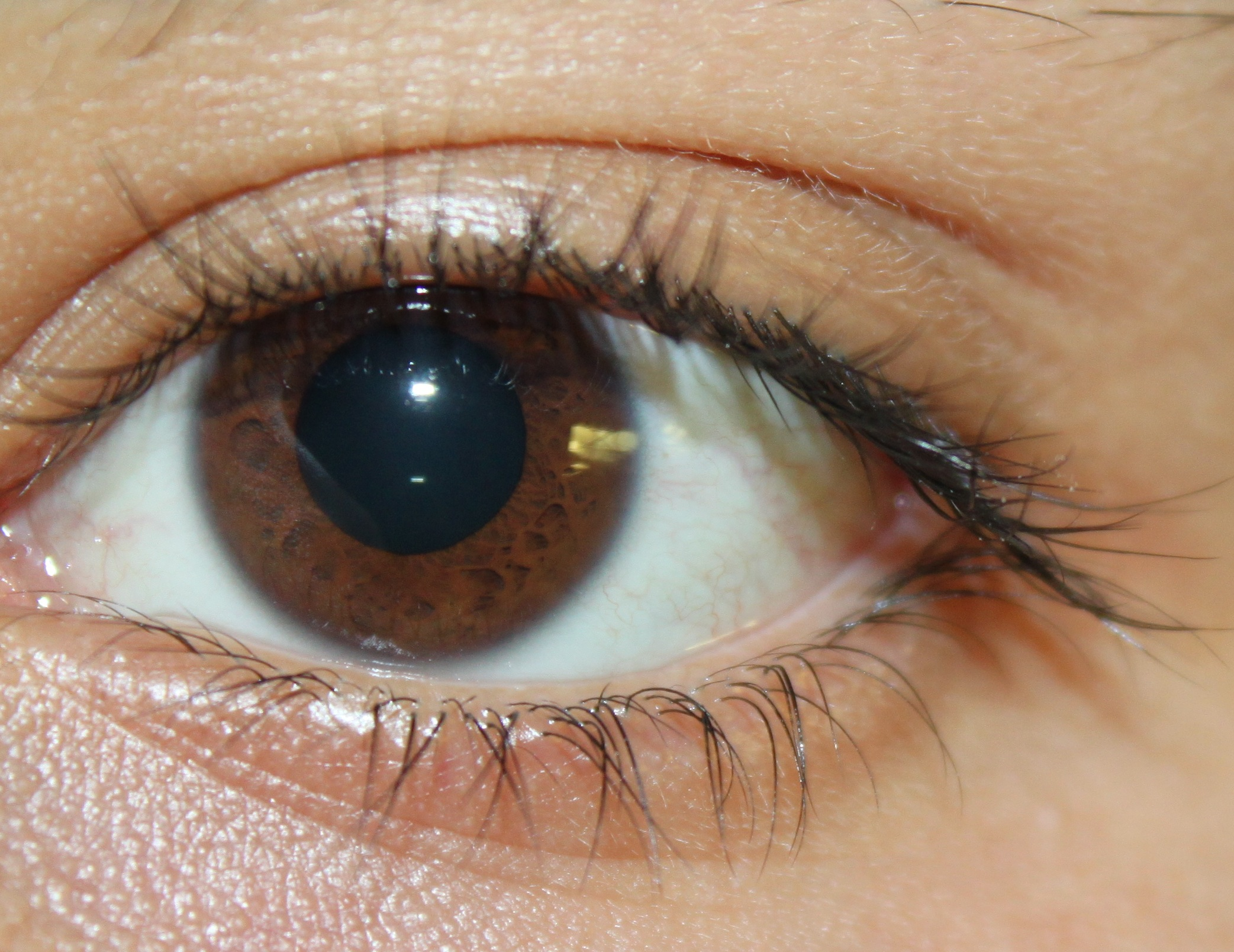
Medium brown iris

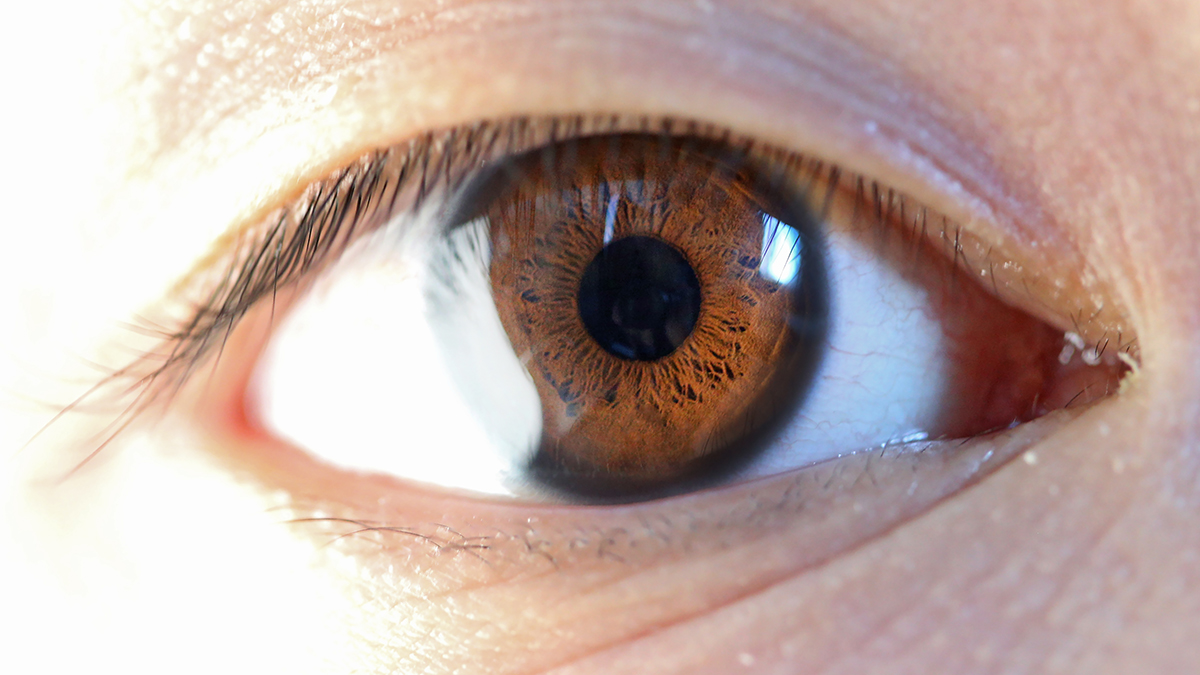
Light brown irises can also be found in East Asia and Southeast Asia, but are relatively rare

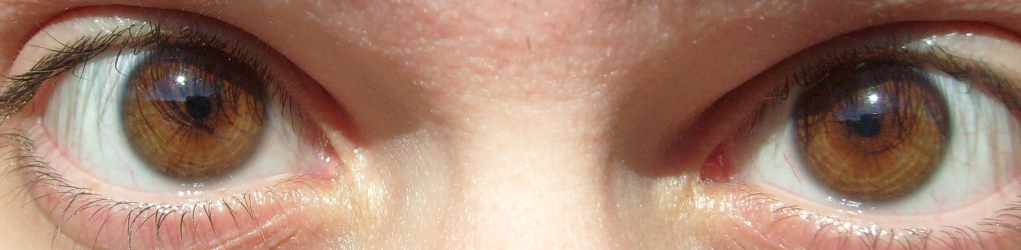
A light brown iris is most common in North Africa, Eastern Europe, the Americas and West Asia

=== Brown hair ===
Brown is the second most common color of human hair, after black. It is caused by higher levels of the natural dark pigment eumelanin, and lower levels of the pale pigment pheomelanin. Brown eumelanin is more common among Europeans, while black eumelanin is more often found in the hair on non-Europeans. A small amount of black eumelanin, in the absence of other pigments, results in grey hair. A small amount of brown eumelanin in the absence of other pigments results in blond hair.

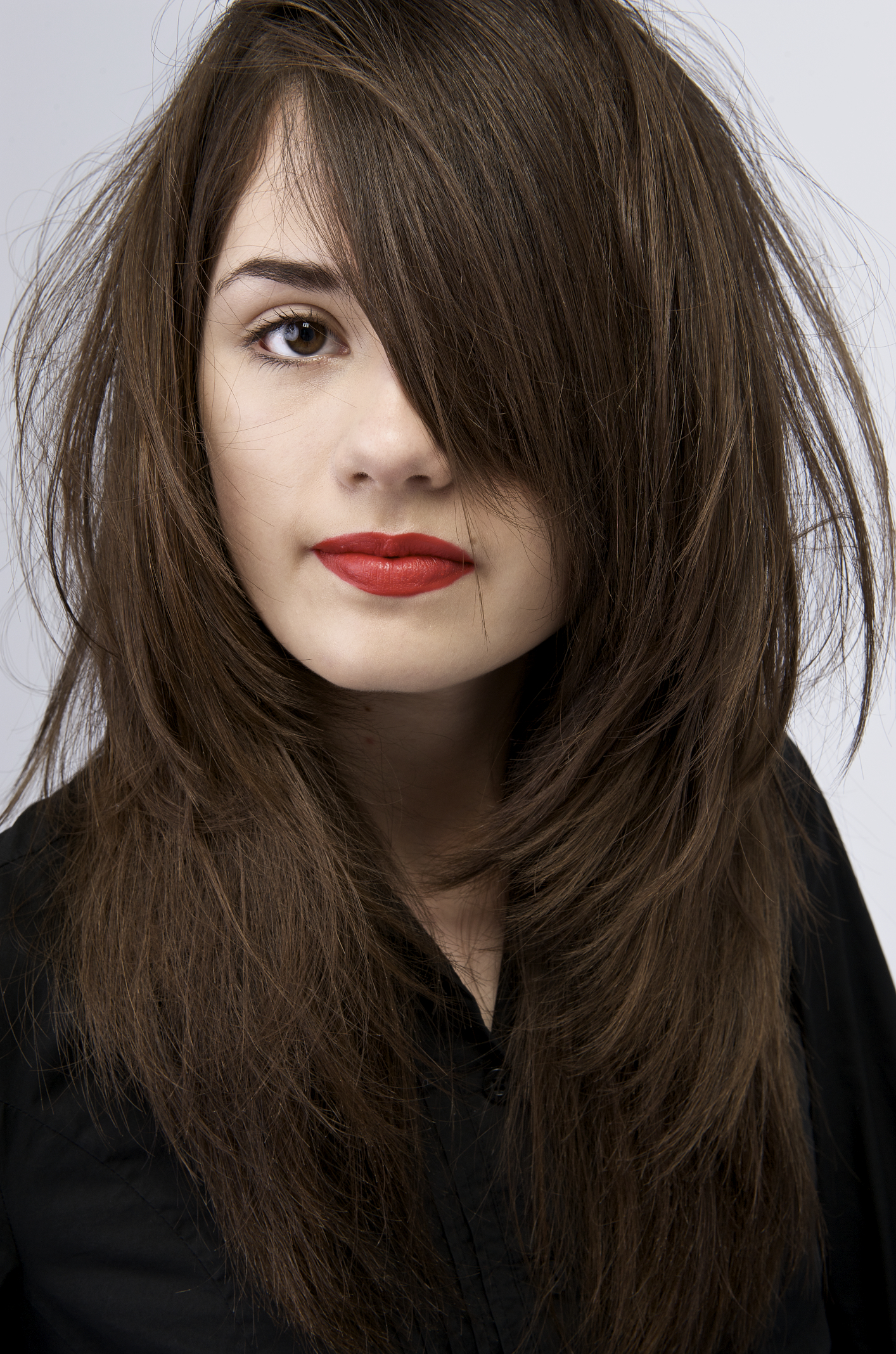
Brunette comes from brune, the French term for a woman with brown hair

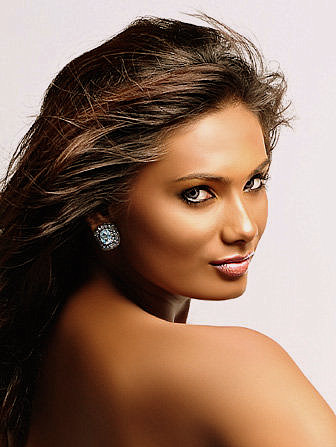
Brown hair with highlights. Nadeeka Perera, a fashion model

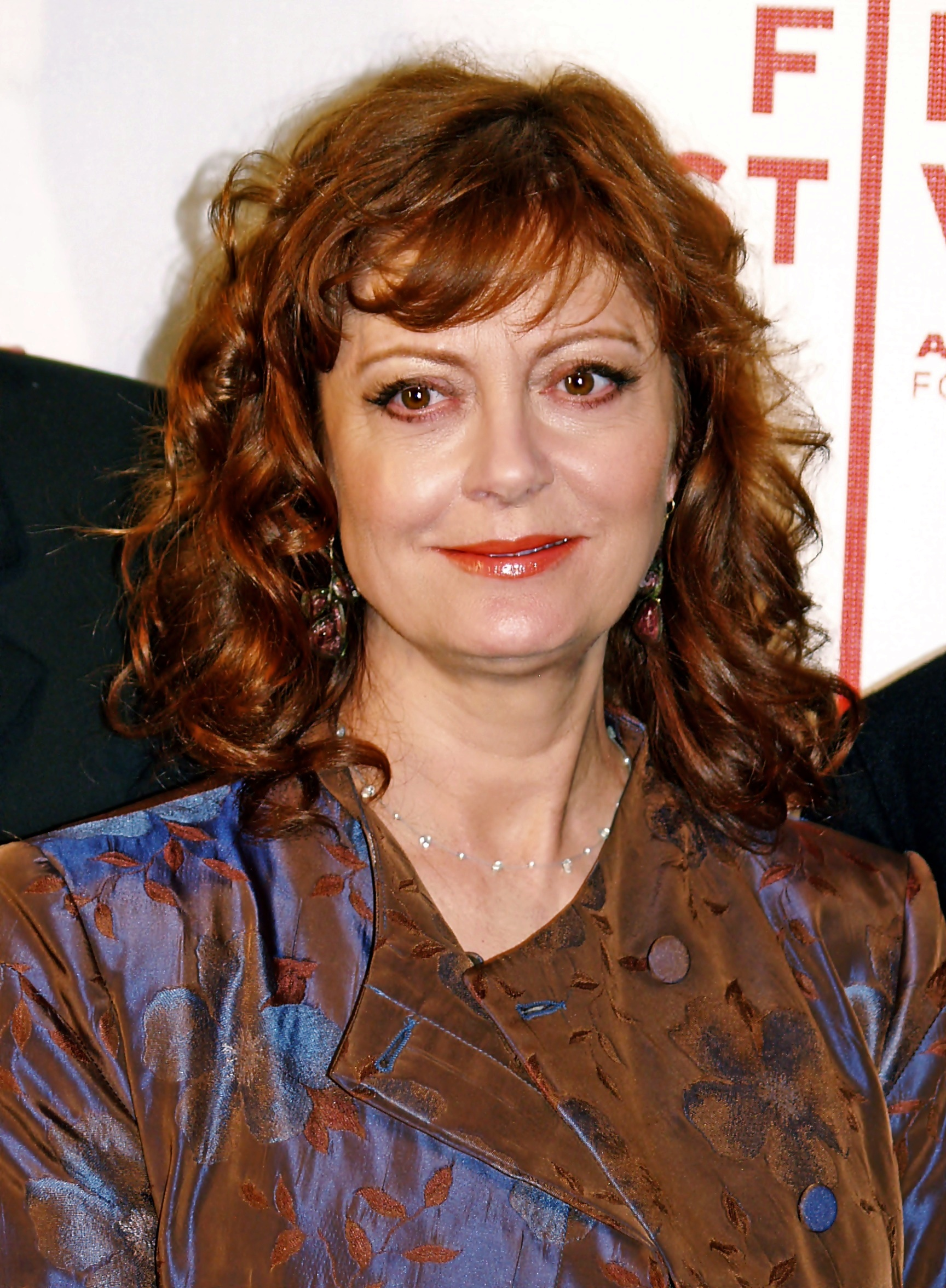
Auburn hair is a reddish brown. This is actress Susan Sarandon

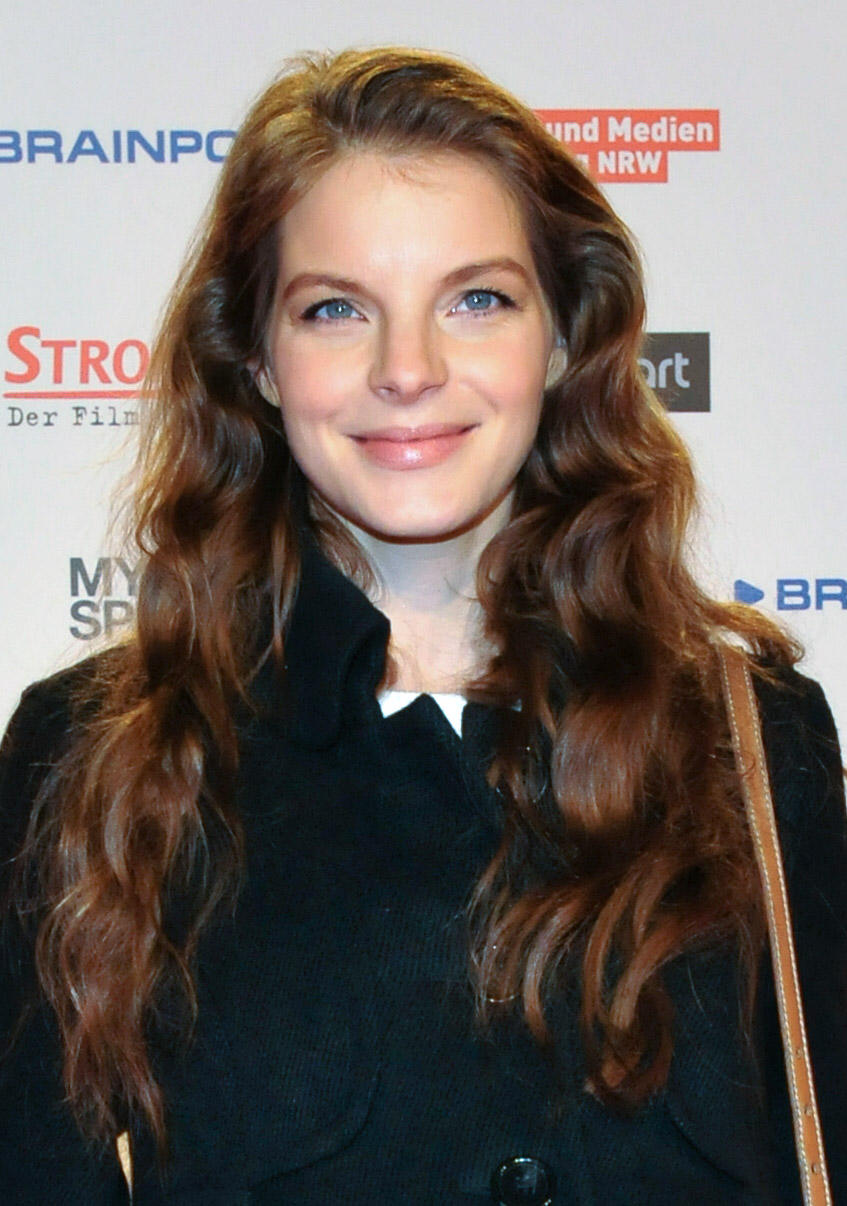
Chestnut color hair also has a reddish tint, but is less red and more brown than auburn hair. This is German singer Yvonne Catterfeld

=== Brown skin ===
A majority of people in the world have skin that is a shade of brown, from a very light honey brown or a golden brown, to a copper or bronze color, to a coffee color or a dark chocolate brown. Skin color and race are not the same; many people classified as "white" or "black" actually have skin that is a shade of brown. Brown skin is caused by melanin, a natural pigment which is produced within the skin in cells called melanocytes. Skin pigmentation in humans evolved to primarily regulate the amount of ultraviolet radiation penetrating the skin, controlling its biochemical effects.

Natural skin color can darken as a result of tanning due to exposure to sunlight. The leading theory is that skin color adapts to intense sunlight irradiation to provide partial protection against the ultraviolet fraction that produces damage and thus mutations in the DNA of the skin cells. There is a correlation between the geographic distribution of ultraviolet radiation (UVR) and the distribution of indigenous skin pigmentation around the world. Darker-skinned populations are found in the regions with the most ultraviolet, closer to the equator, while lighter skinned populations live closer to the poles, with less UVR, though immigration has changed these patterns.

While white and black are commonly used to describe racial groups, brown is rarely used, because it crosses all racial lines. In Brazil, the Portuguese word pardo, which can mean different shades of brown, is used to refer to multiracial people. The Brazilian Institute of Geography and Statistics (IBGE) asks people to identify themselves as branco (white), pardo (brown), negro (black), or amarelo (yellow). In 2008 43.8 percent of the population identified themselves as pardo. (See human skin color).

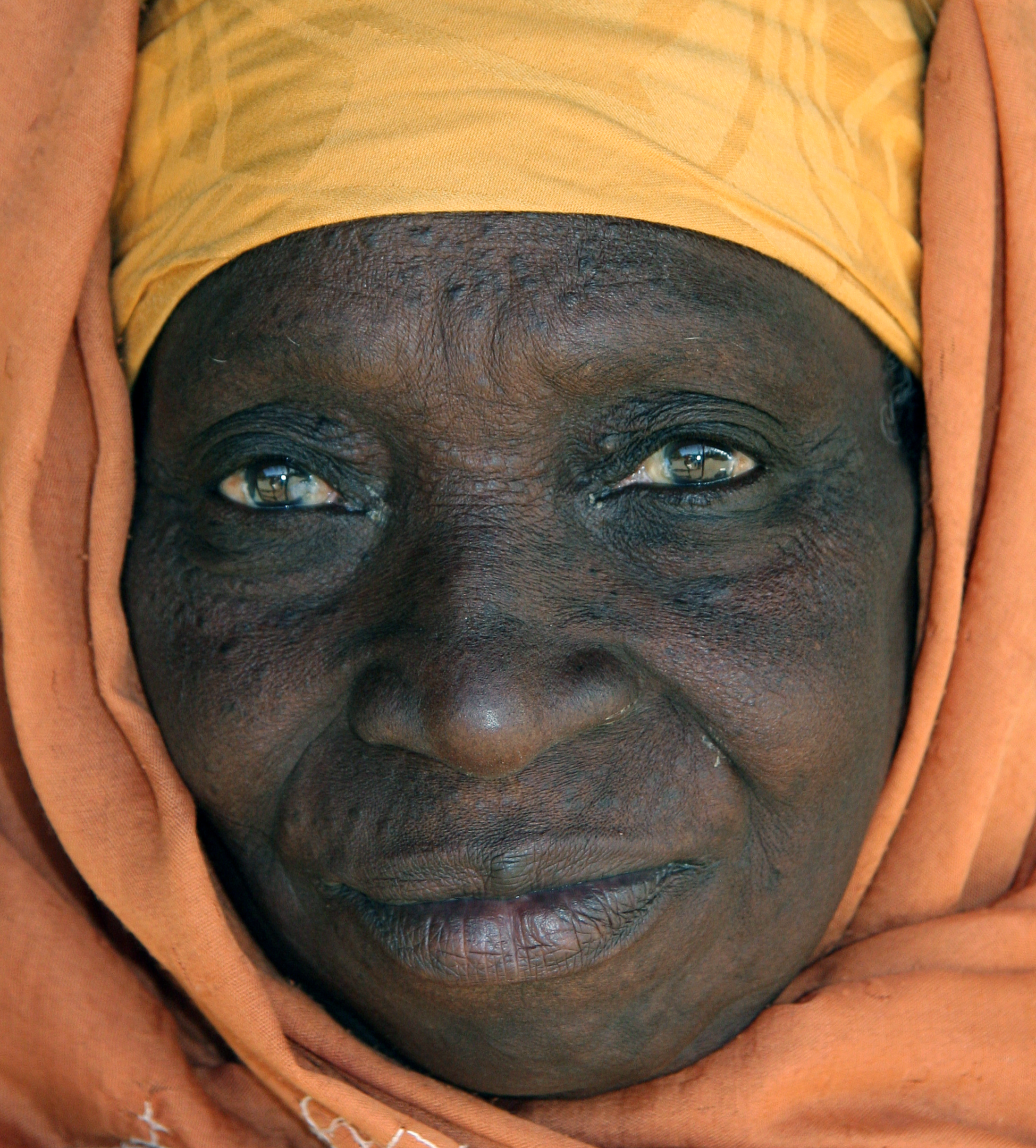
An elderly woman from Gambia

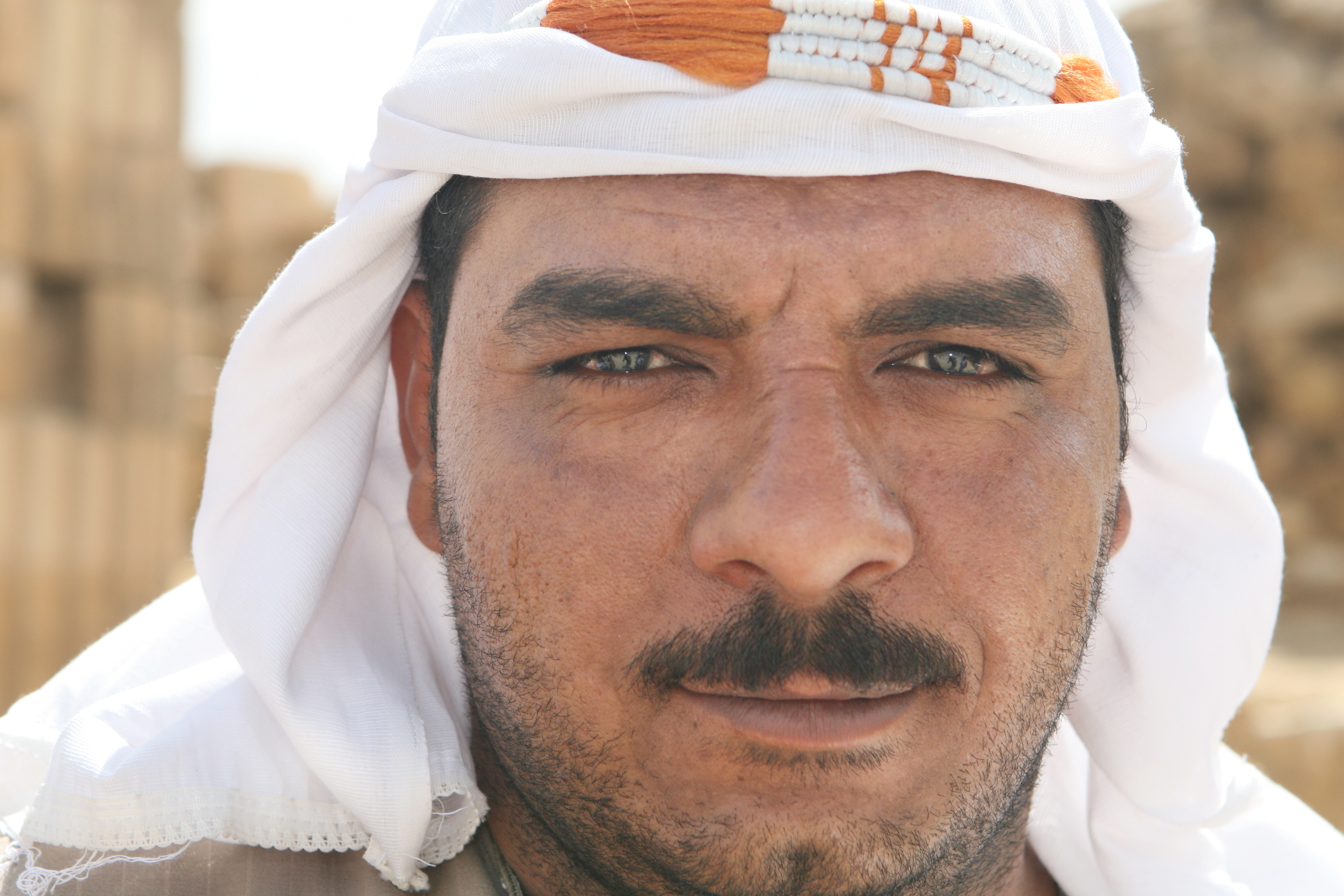
A man from Egypt

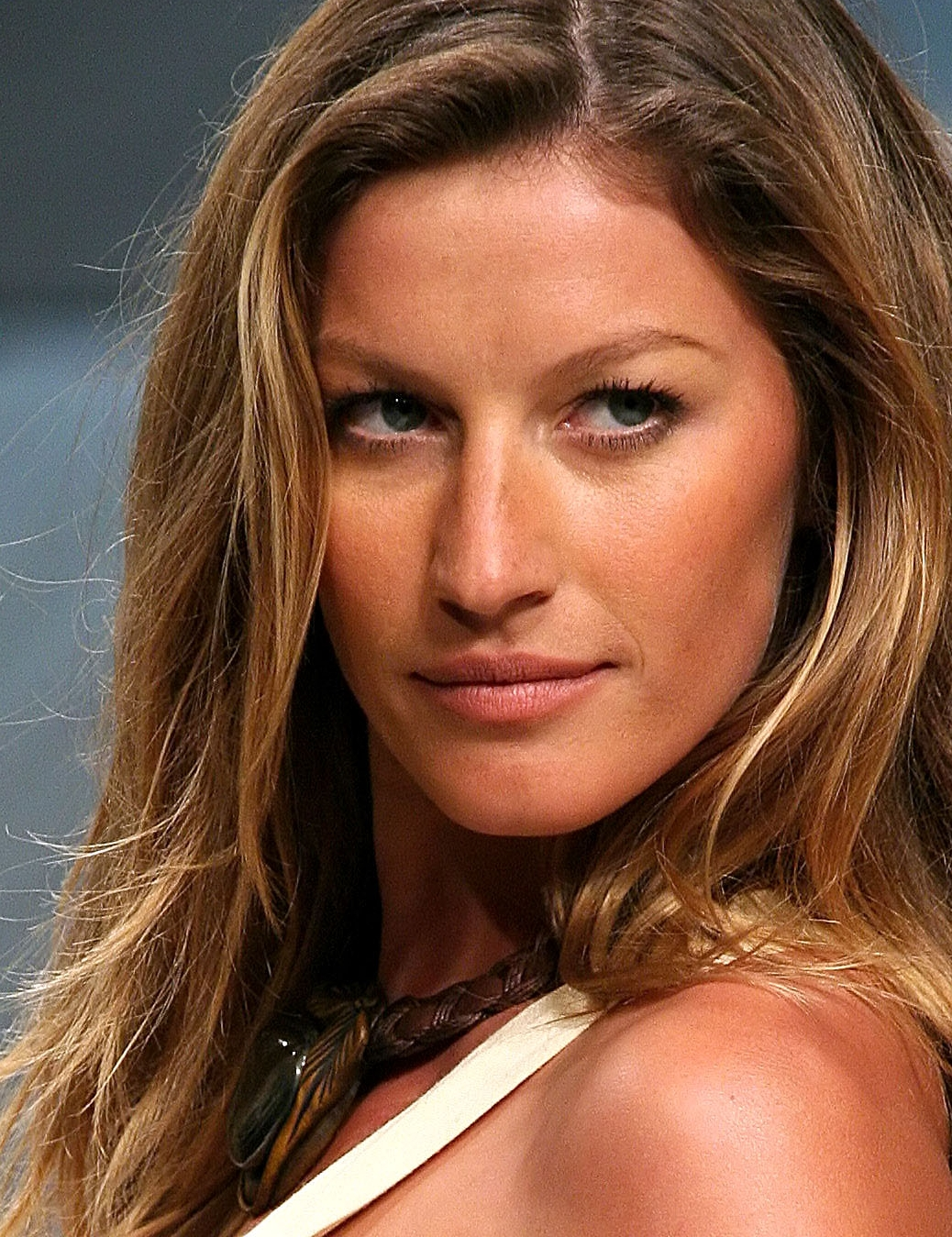
Brazilian model Gisele Bundchen

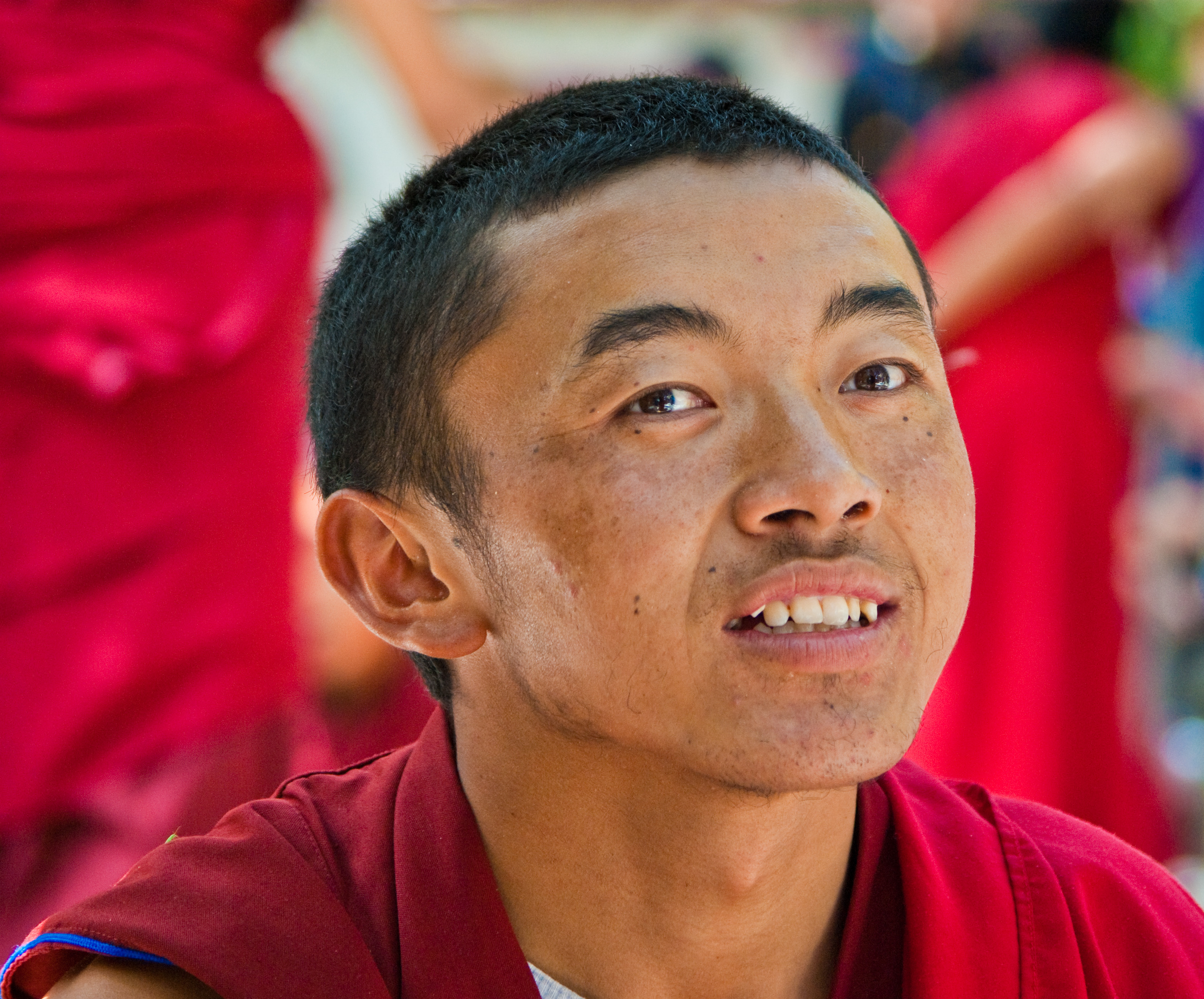
A man from Tibet

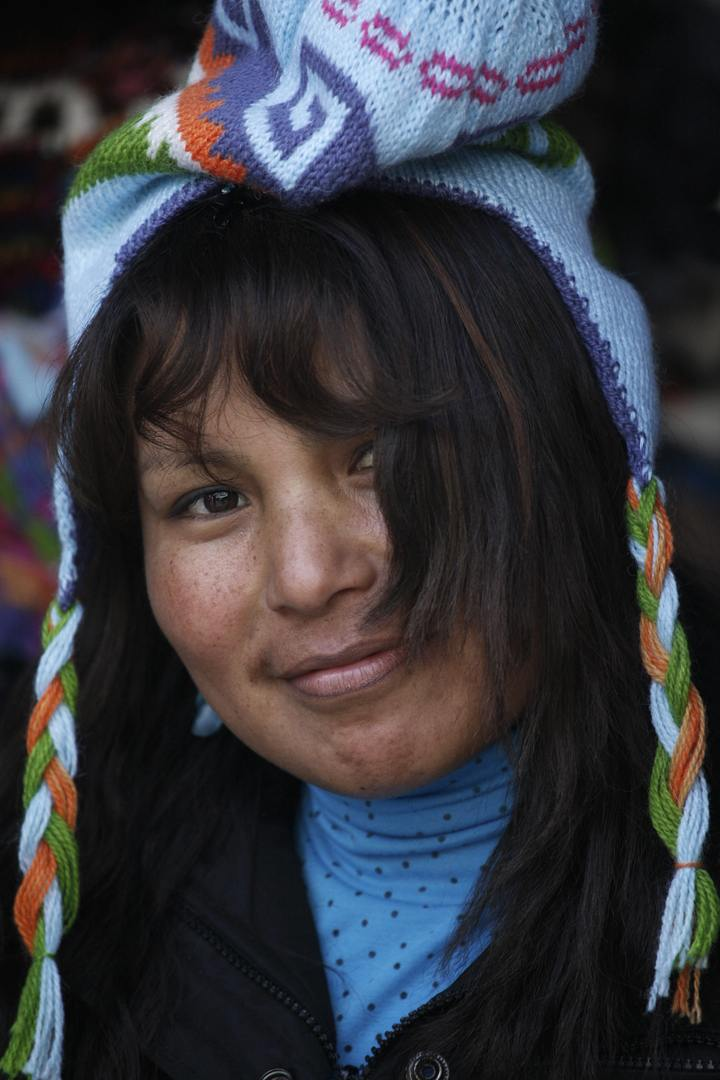
A young woman from Peru

=== Soil ===
The thin top layer of the Earth's crust on land is largely made up of soil colored different shades of brown. Good soil is composed of about forty-five percent minerals, twenty-five percent water, twenty-five percent air, and five percent organic material, living and dead. Half the color of soil comes from minerals it contains; soils containing iron turn yellowish or reddish as the iron oxidizes. Manganese, nitrogen and sulfur turn brownish or blackish as they decay naturally.

Rich and fertile soils tend to be darker in color; the deeper brown color of fertile soil comes from the decomposing of the organic matter. Dead leaves and roots become black or brown as they decay. Poorer soils are usually paler brown in color, and contain less water or organic matter.

- Mollisols are the soil type found under grassland in the Great Plains of America, the Pampas in Argentina and the Russian Steppes. The soil is 60–80 centimeters deep and is rich in nutrients and organic matter.
- Loess is a type of pale yellow or buff soil, which originated as wind-blown silt. It is very fertile, but is easily eroded by wind or water.
- Peat is an accumulation of partially decayed vegetation, whose decomposition is slowed by water. Despite its dark brown color, it is infertile, but is useful as a fuel.
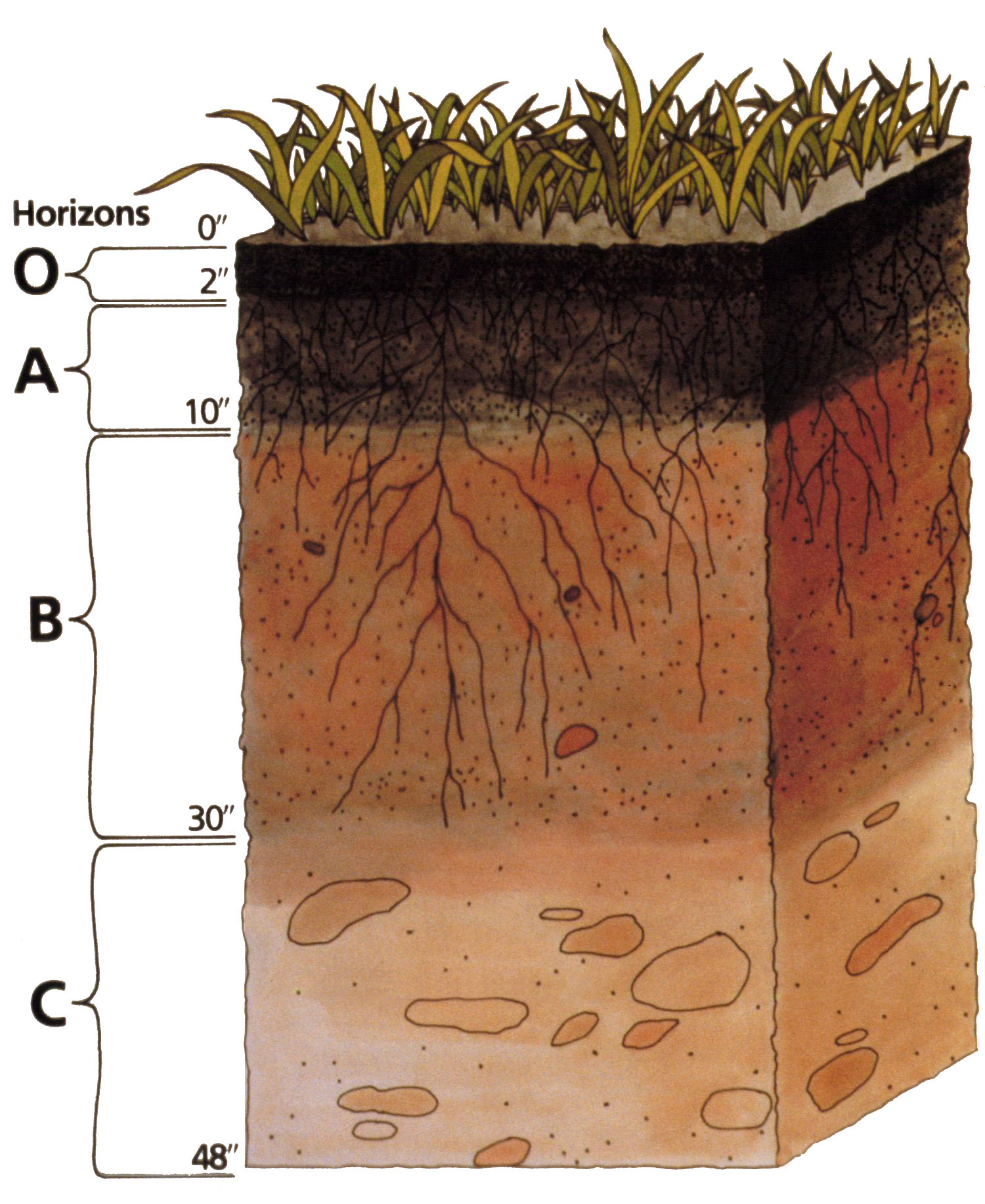
A typical soil profile; dark-brown topsoils, rich with organic matter, above reddish-brown lower layers

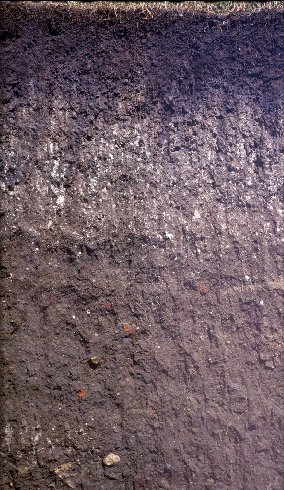
A profile of layers of Mollisols, the soil type found in the Great Plains of the U.S., the Pampas in Argentina, and the Russian Steppes

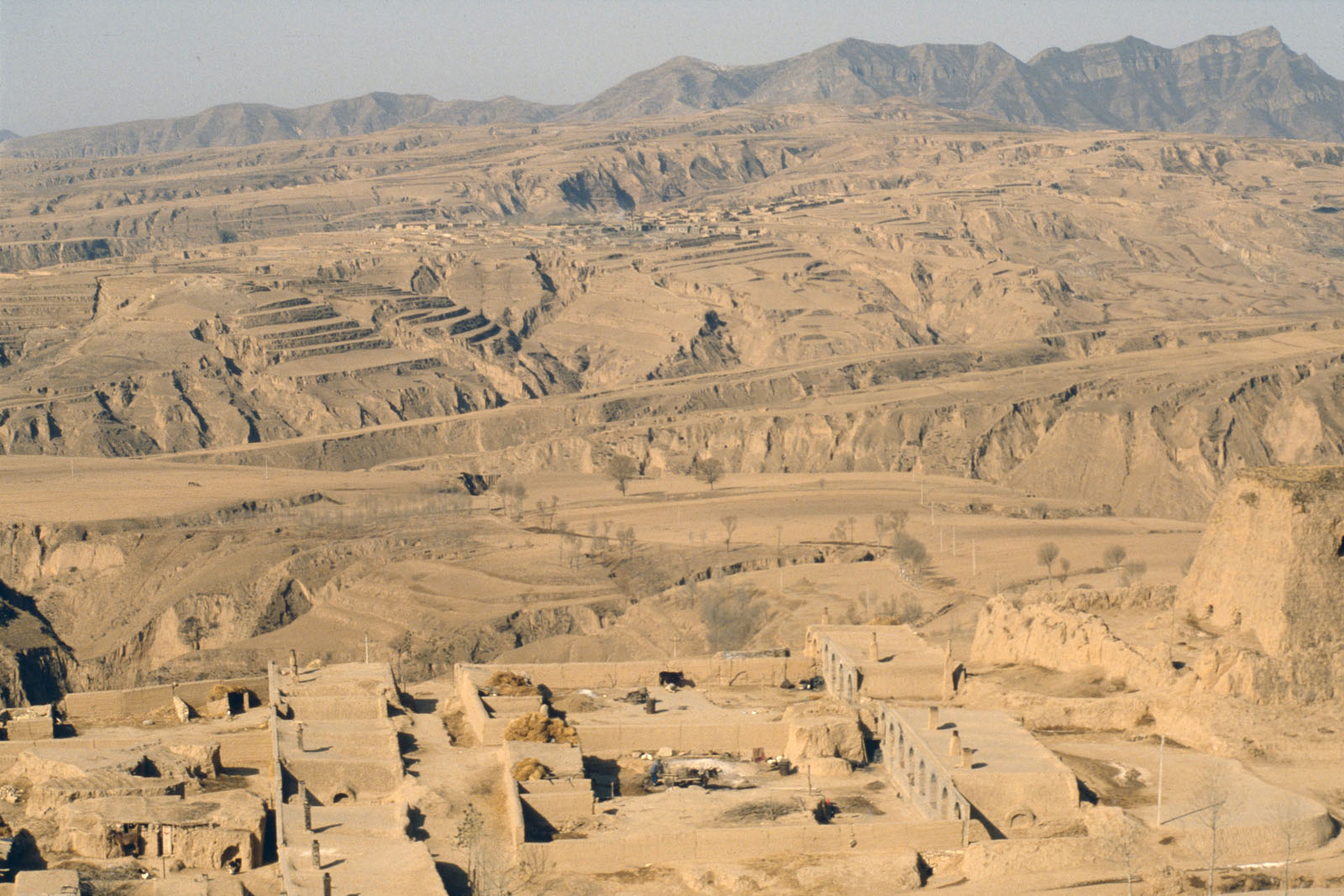
A landscape of loess soil in Datong, Shanxi, China. Loess originated as windblown silt. It is very fertile but erodes easily

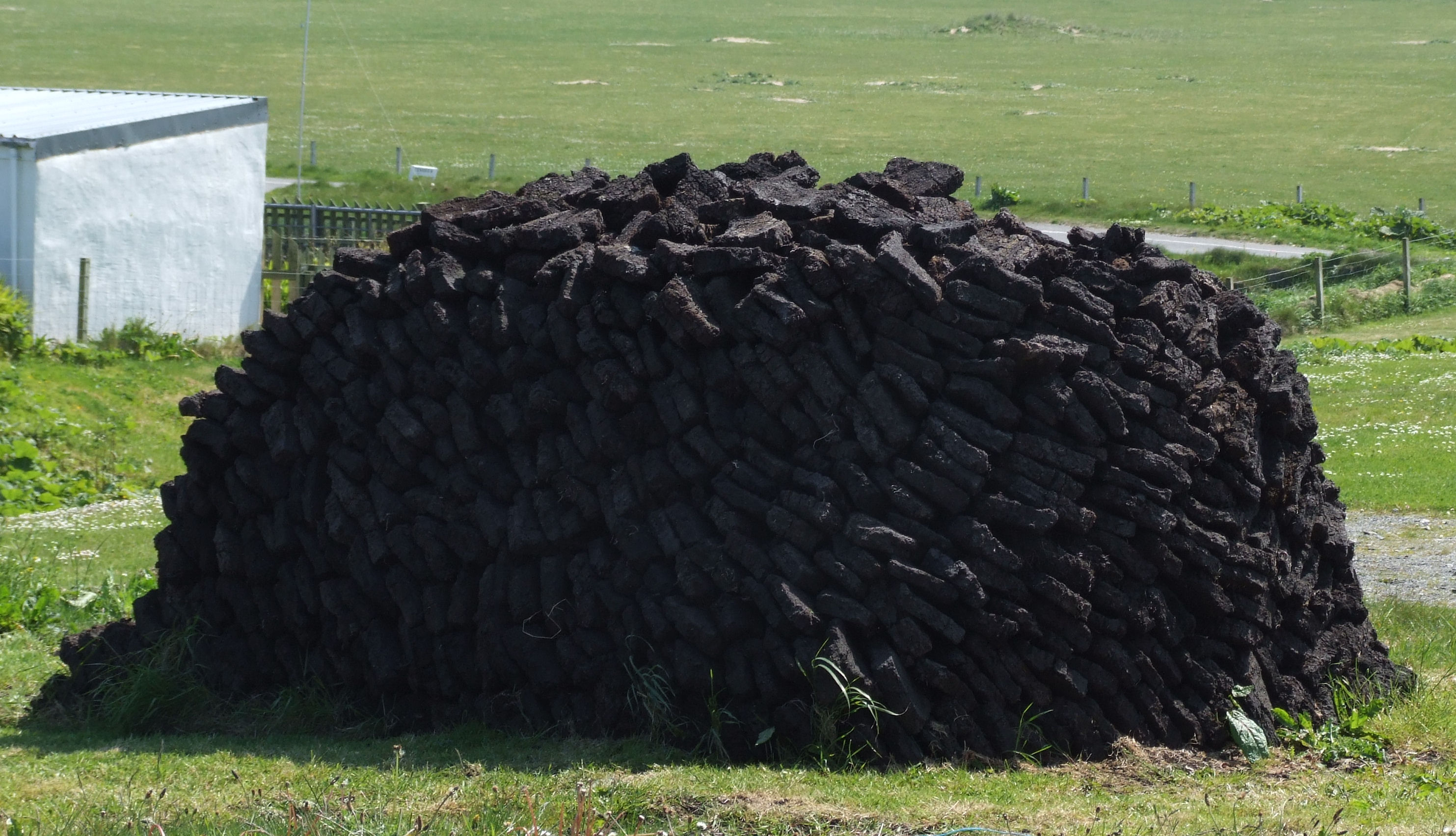
A stack of peat cut from the Earth in the Outer Hebrides, Scotland. Peat is partially decayed vegetative matter

=== Mammals and birds ===
A large number of mammals and predatory birds have a brown coloration. This sometimes changes seasonally, and sometimes remains the same year-round. This color is likely related to camouflage, since the backdrop of some environments, such as the forest floor, is often brown, and especially in the spring and summertime when animals like the snowshoe hare get brown fur. Most mammals are dichromats and so do not easily distinguish brown fur from green grass.

- The brown rat or Norwegian rat (Rattus norvegicus) is one of the best known and most common rats.
- The brown bear (Ursus arctos) is a large bear distributed across much of northern Eurasia and North America.
- The ermine (Mustela erminea) has a brown back in summer, or year-round in the southern reaches of its range.
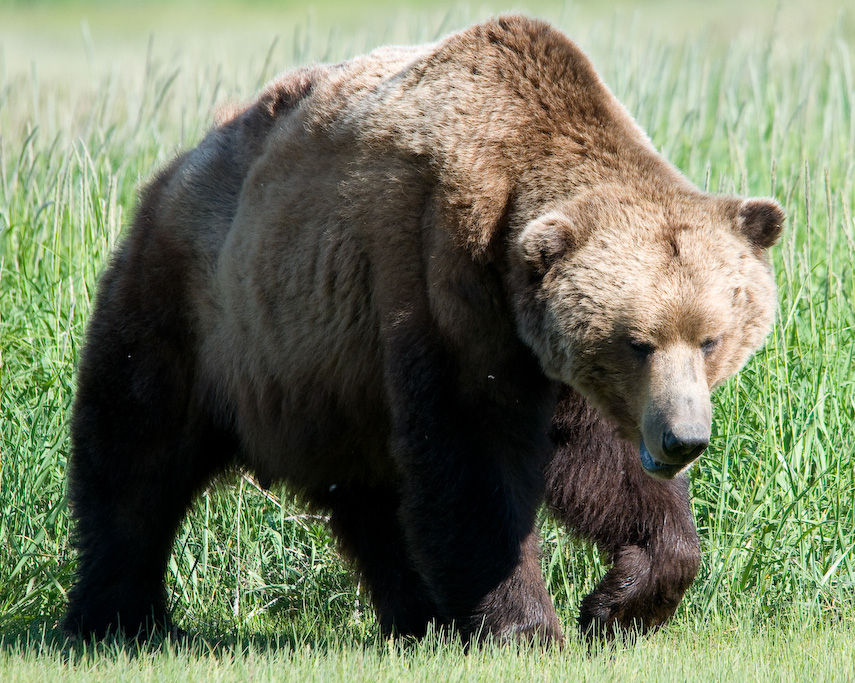
The brown bear is found across Eurasia and North America

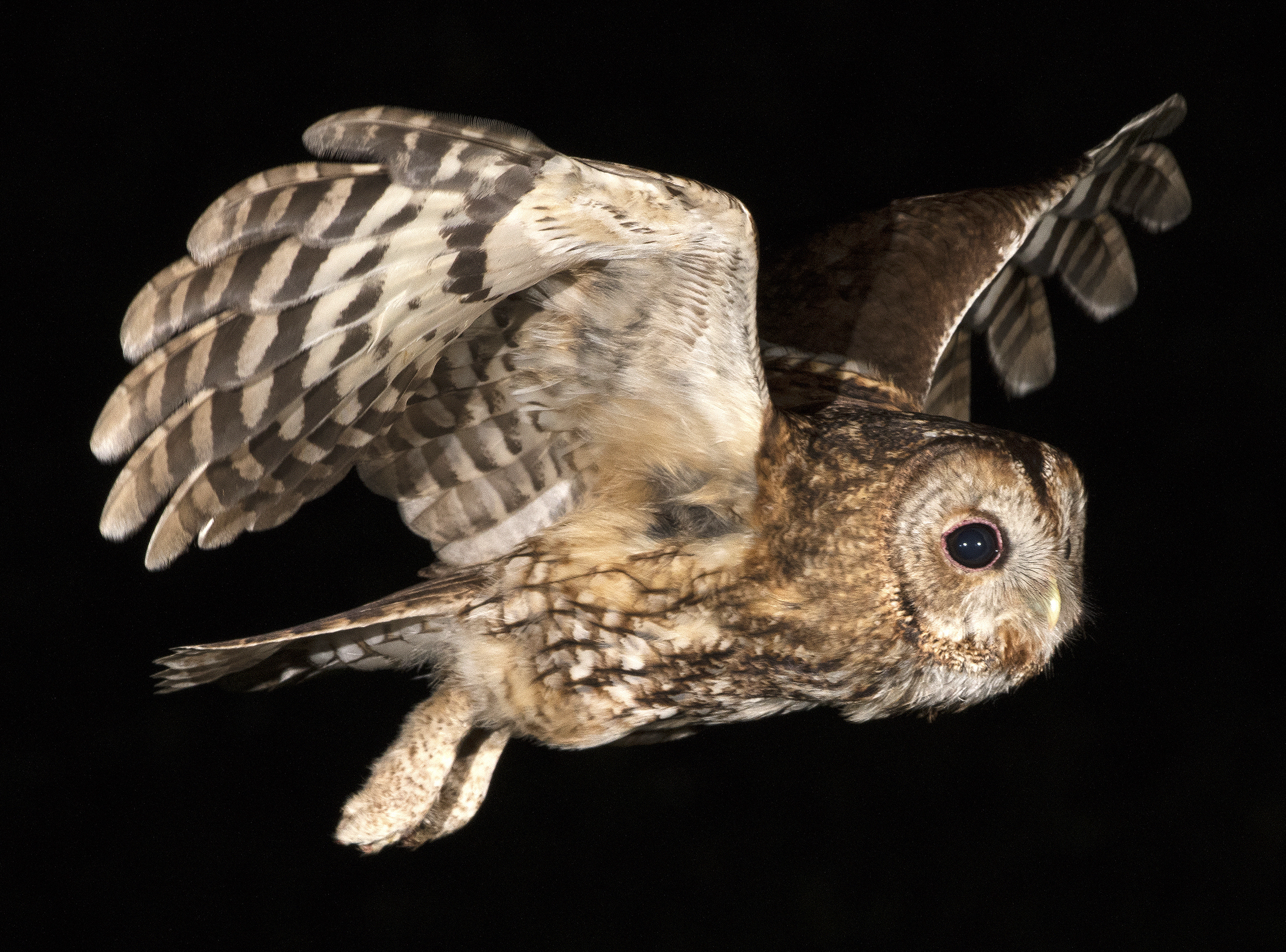
The tawny owl. The color tawny takes its name from the old French word tané, which means to tan leather. The same word is the root of suntan and the color tan

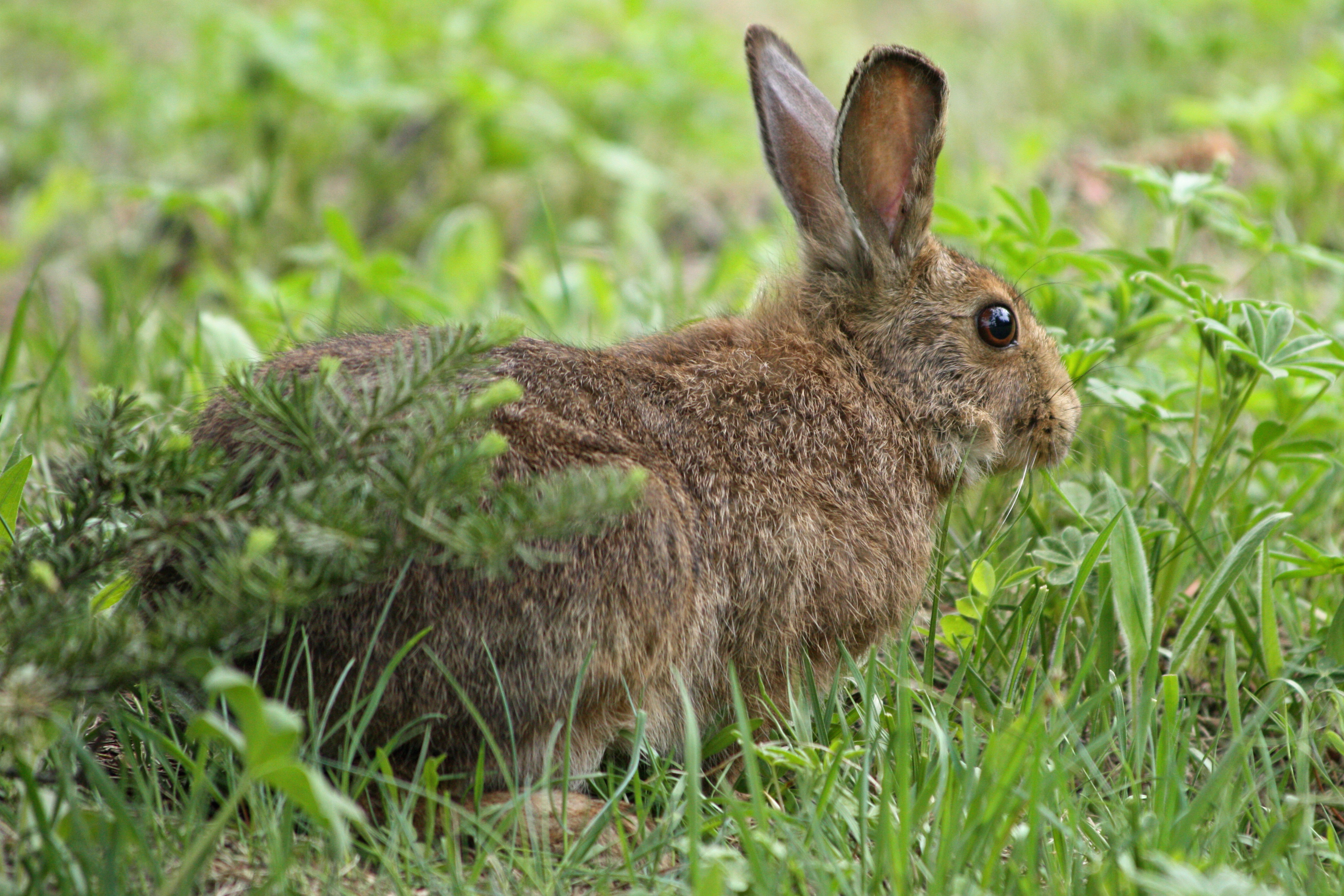
The fur of the snowshoe hare is brown in the summer and turns white in winter, as a form of all-season natural camouflage

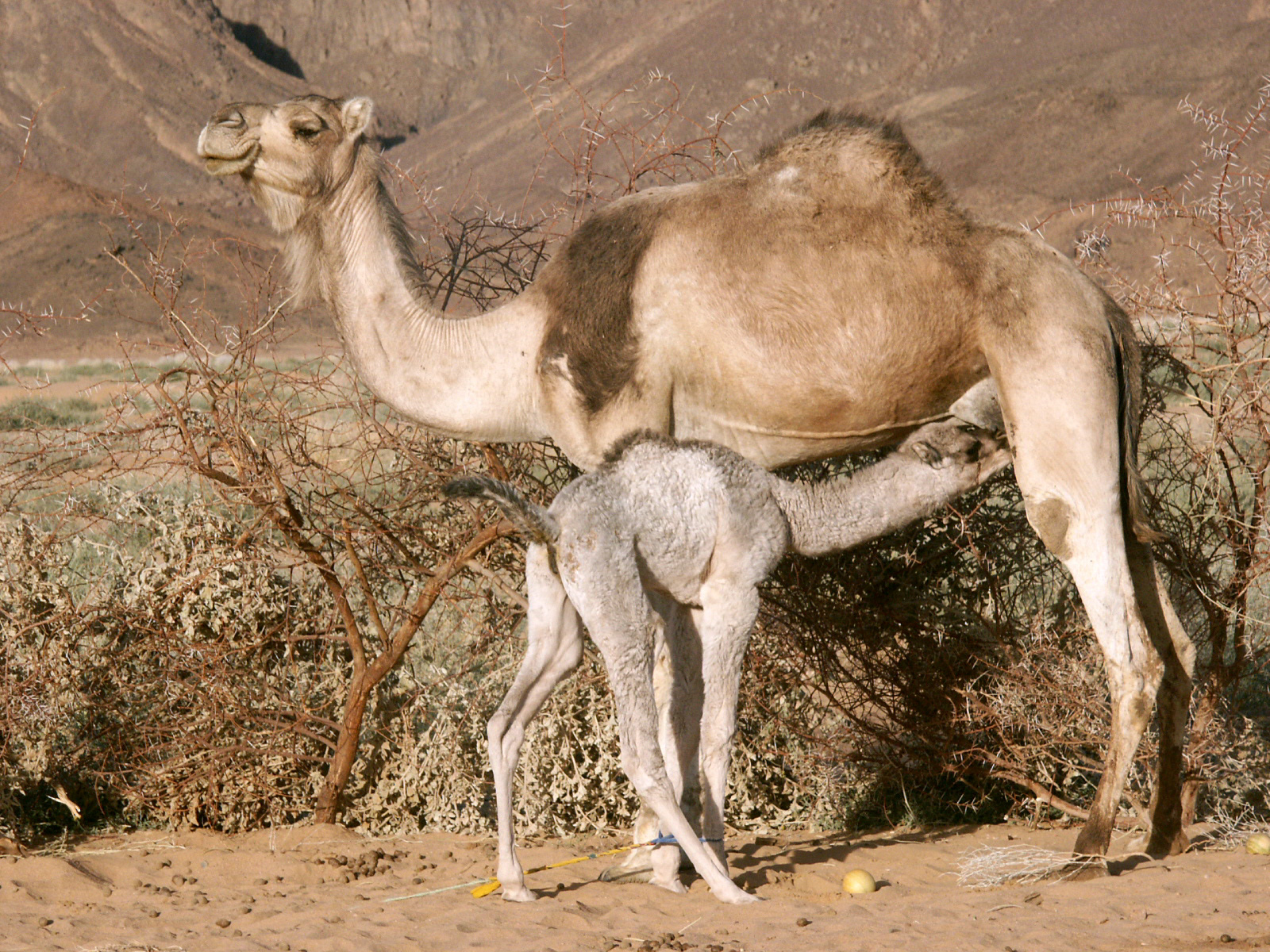
Camel is an effective color for camouflage in the Sahara desert, and is also a popular color for blankets and winter overcoats

=== Biology ===
- The solid waste excreted by human beings and many other animals is characteristically brown in color due to the presence of bilirubin, a byproduct of destruction of red blood cells.

== Brown in culture ==
Public opinion surveys in Europe and the United States showed brown to be the least popular color among respondents. It was the favorite color of only one percent of respondents, and the least favorite color of twenty percent.

=== Brown uniforms ===
Brown has been a popular color for military uniforms since the late 18th century, largely because of its wide availability and low visibility. When the Continental Army was established in 1775 at the outbreak of the American Revolution, the first Continental Congress declared that the official uniform color would be brown, but this was not popular with many militias, whose officers were already wearing blue. In 1778 the Congress asked George Washington to design a new uniform, and in 1779 Washington made the official color of all uniforms blue and buff.

In 1846 the Indian soldiers of the Corps of Guides in British India began to wear a yellowish shade of tan, which became known as khaki from the Urdu word for dust-colored, taken from an earlier Persian word for soil. The color made an excellent natural camouflage, and was adopted by the British Army for their Abyssian Campaign in 1867–1868, and later in the Boer War. It was adopted by the United States Army during the Spanish–American War (1896), and afterwards by the United States Navy and United States Marine Corps.

In the 1920s, brown became the uniform color of the Nazi Party in Germany. The Nazi paramilitary organization the Sturmabteilung (SA) wore brown uniforms and were known as the brownshirts. The color brown was used to represent the Nazi vote on maps of electoral districts in Germany. If someone voted for the Nazis, they were said to be "voting brown". The national headquarters of the Nazi party, in Munich, was called the Brown House. The Nazi seizure of power in 1933 was called the Brown Revolution. At Adolf Hitler's Obersalzberg home, the Berghof, he slept in a "bed which was usually covered by a brown quilt embroidered with a huge swastika.

The swastika also appeared on Hitler's brown satin pajamas, embroidered in black against a red background on the pocket. He had a matching brown silk robe." Brown had originally been chosen as a Party color largely for convenience; large numbers of war-surplus brown uniforms from Germany's former colonial forces in Africa were cheaply available in the 1920s. It also suited the working-class and military images that the Party wished to convey.

From the 1930s onwards, the Party's brown uniforms were mass-produced by German clothing firms such as Hugo Boss.

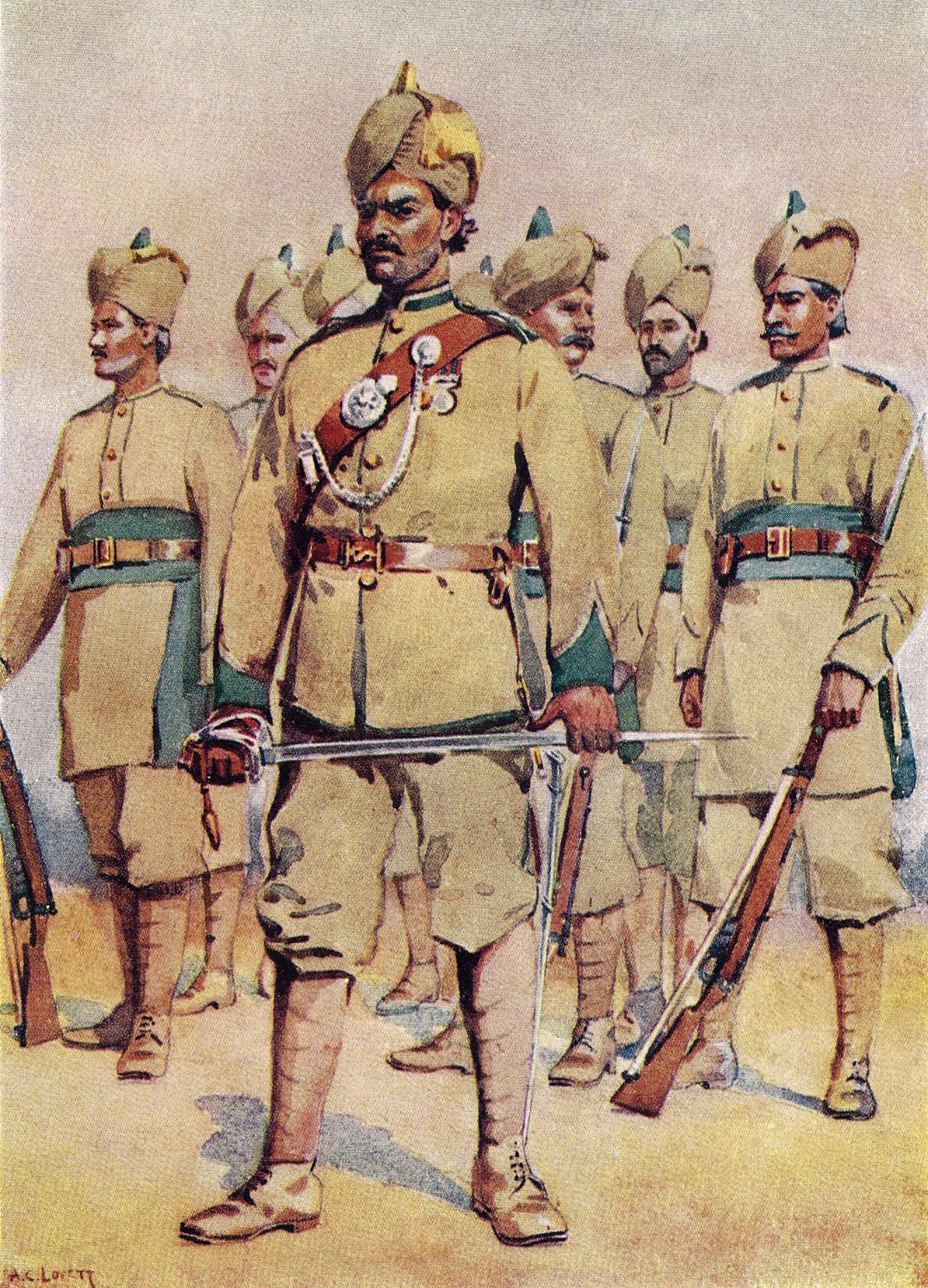
The khaki uniforms of Indian soldiers in British India

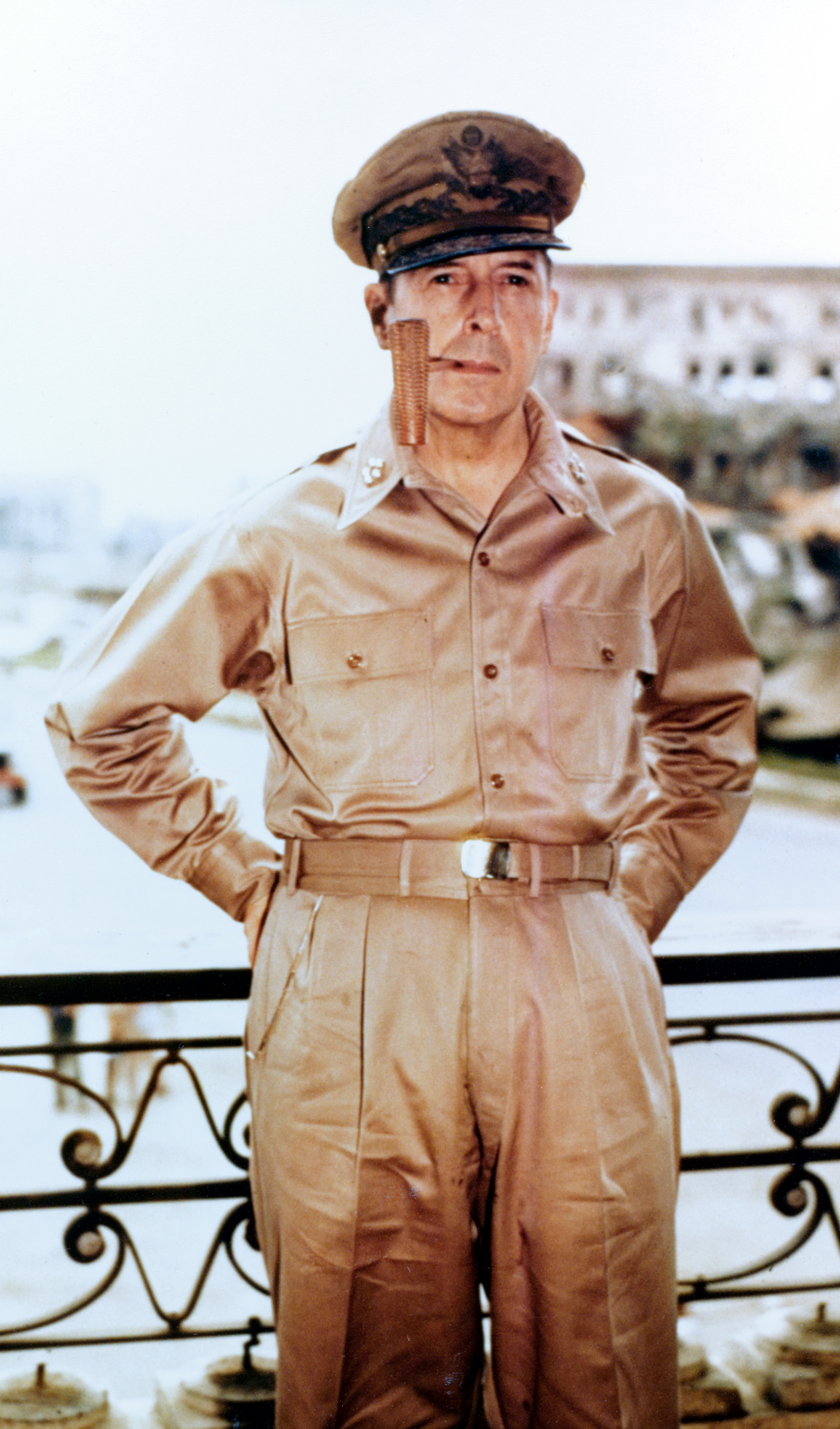
General Douglas MacArthur in Khaki on August 2, 1945

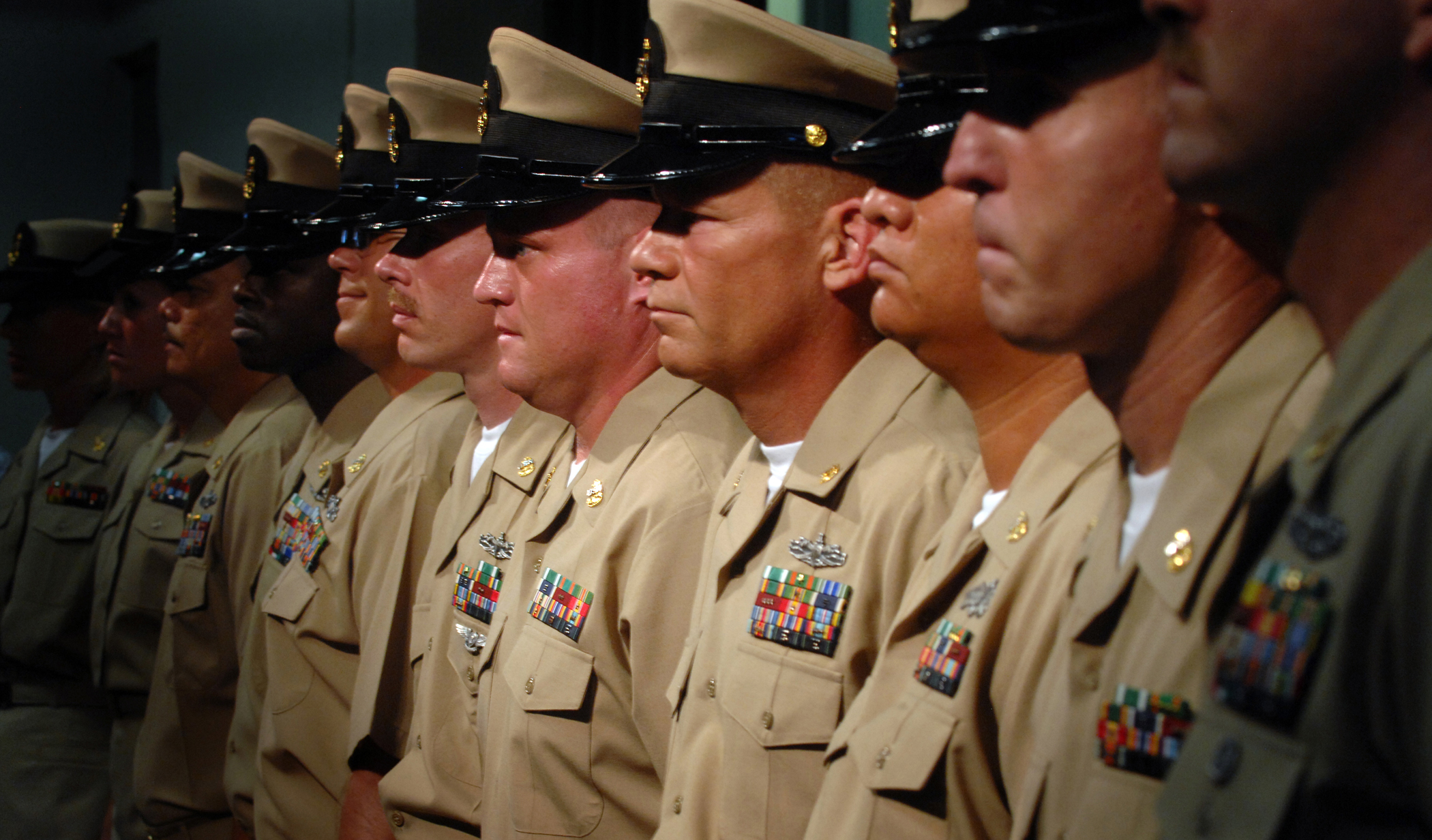
Chief petty officers of the U.S. Navy in their khaki service uniforms

=== Business ===
Pullman Brown is the color of the United Parcel Service (UPS) delivery company with their trademark brown trucks and uniforms; it was earlier the color of Pullman rail cars of the Pullman Company, and was adopted by UPS both because brown is easy to keep clean, and due to favorable associations of luxury that Pullman brown evoked. UPS has filed two trademarks on the color brown to prevent other shipping companies (and possibly other companies in general) from using the color if it creates "market confusion". In its advertising, UPS refers to itself as "Brown" ("What can Brown do for you?"). Labrecque, et al. (2012) have hypothesized that brown would be related to competence when used in advertising, as the color is typically associated with reliability and support. However, they did not find a link between brown and competence.

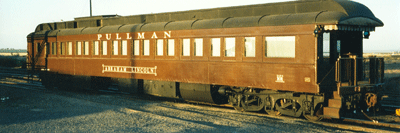
A Pullman rail car, in traditional brown

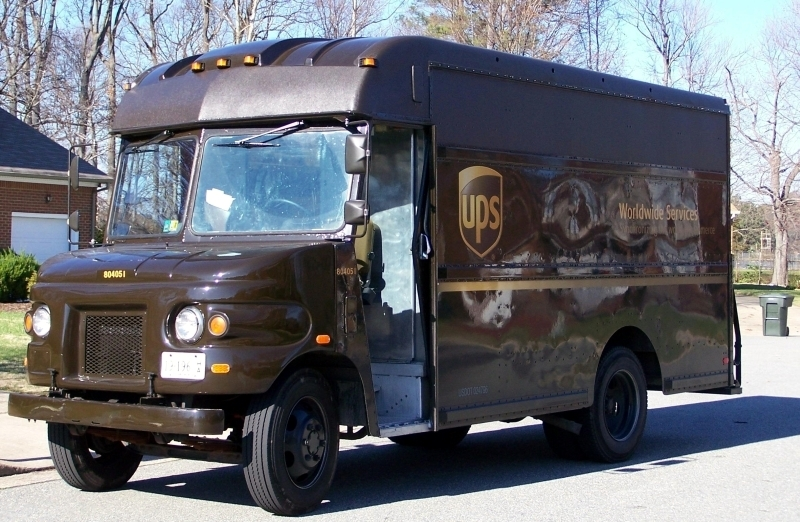
A UPS truck in Pullman brown

=== Idioms and expressions ===
- "To be brown as a berry" (to be deeply suntanned)
- "To brown bag" a meal (to bring food from home to eat at work or school rather than patronizing an in-house cafeteria or a restaurant)
- "To experience a brown out" (a partial loss of electricity, less severe than a blackout)
- Brownfields are abandoned, idled, or under-used industrial and commercial facilities where redevelopment for infill housing is complicated by real or perceived environmental contaminations.
- '"Brown-nose" is a verb which means to be obsequious. It comes from the term for kissing the posterior of the boss in order to gain advancement.
- "In a brown study" (melancholy)

=== Religion ===
- In Wicca, brown represents endurance, solidity, grounding, and strength. It is strongly associated with the element of earth.

=== Sports ===
- The Cleveland Browns of the National Football League, take their team name from its founder and long-time coach, Paul Brown, and use brown as a team color.
- The Hawthorn Football Club of the Australian Football League wears a brown and gold uniform.
- The San Diego Padres of Major League Baseball utilizes brown as their primary color.
- FC St. Pauli, a German association football club, typically features brown shirts as its primary kit.
- Club Atlético Platense in Argentina, typically features brown shirts as its primary kit.
- The University of Wyoming, Brown University, St. Bonaventure University, and Lehigh University sports teams generally feature this color.

== Image examples in nature and culture ==
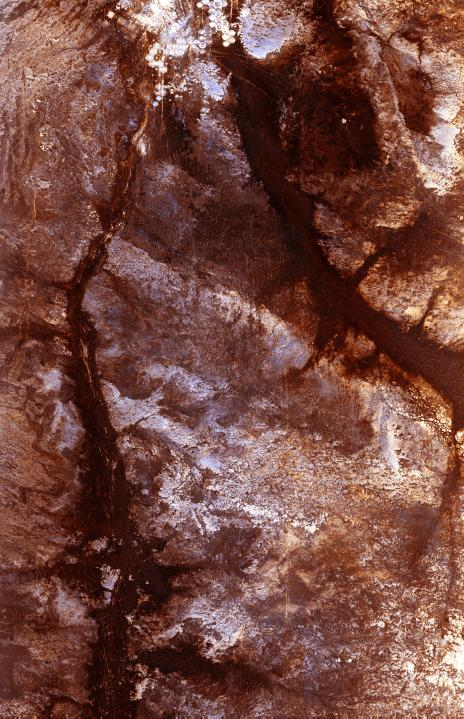
The Sahara Desert around the Kufra Oasis, Libya, seen from space

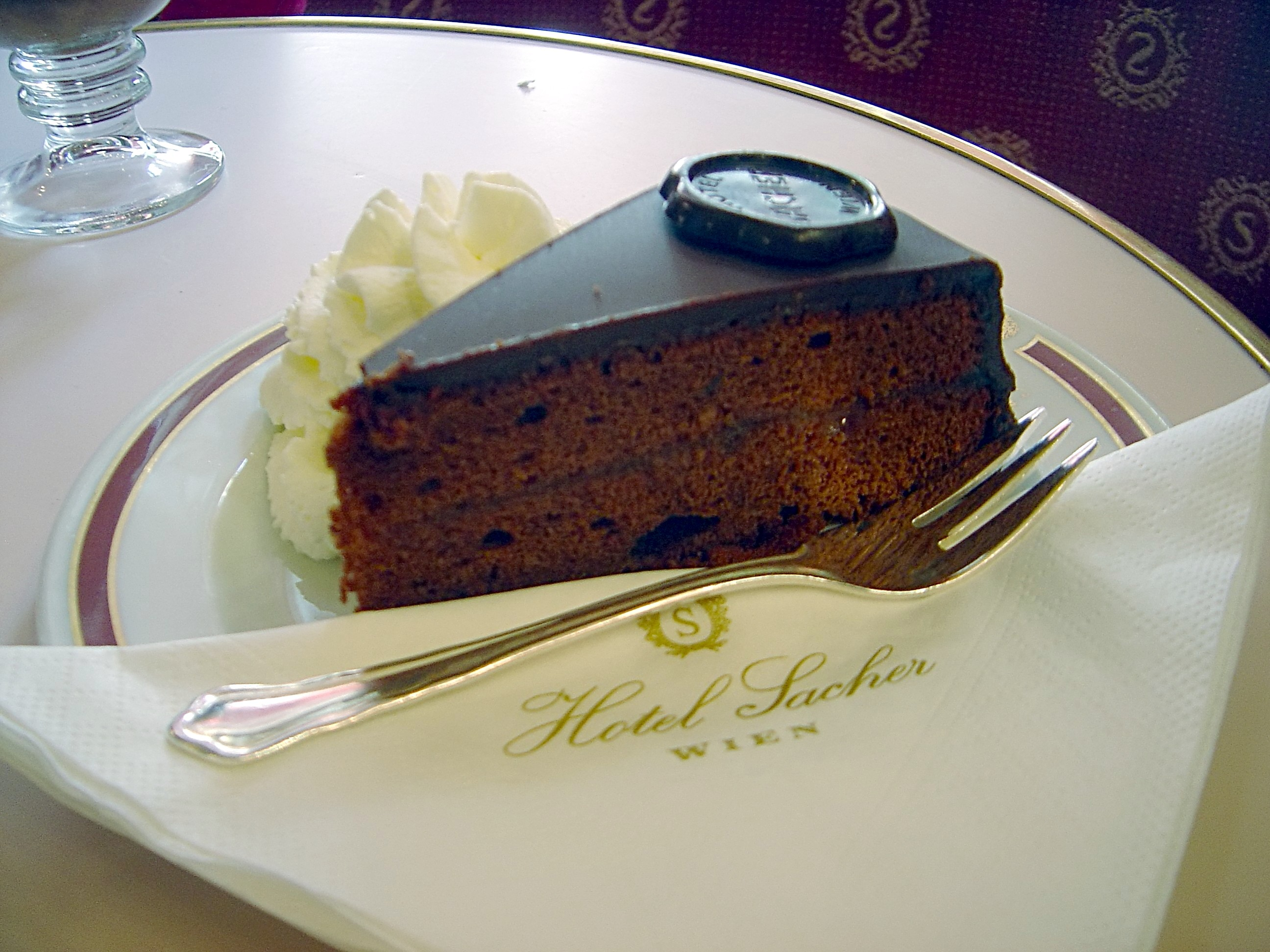
A sachertorte in a Vienna cafe

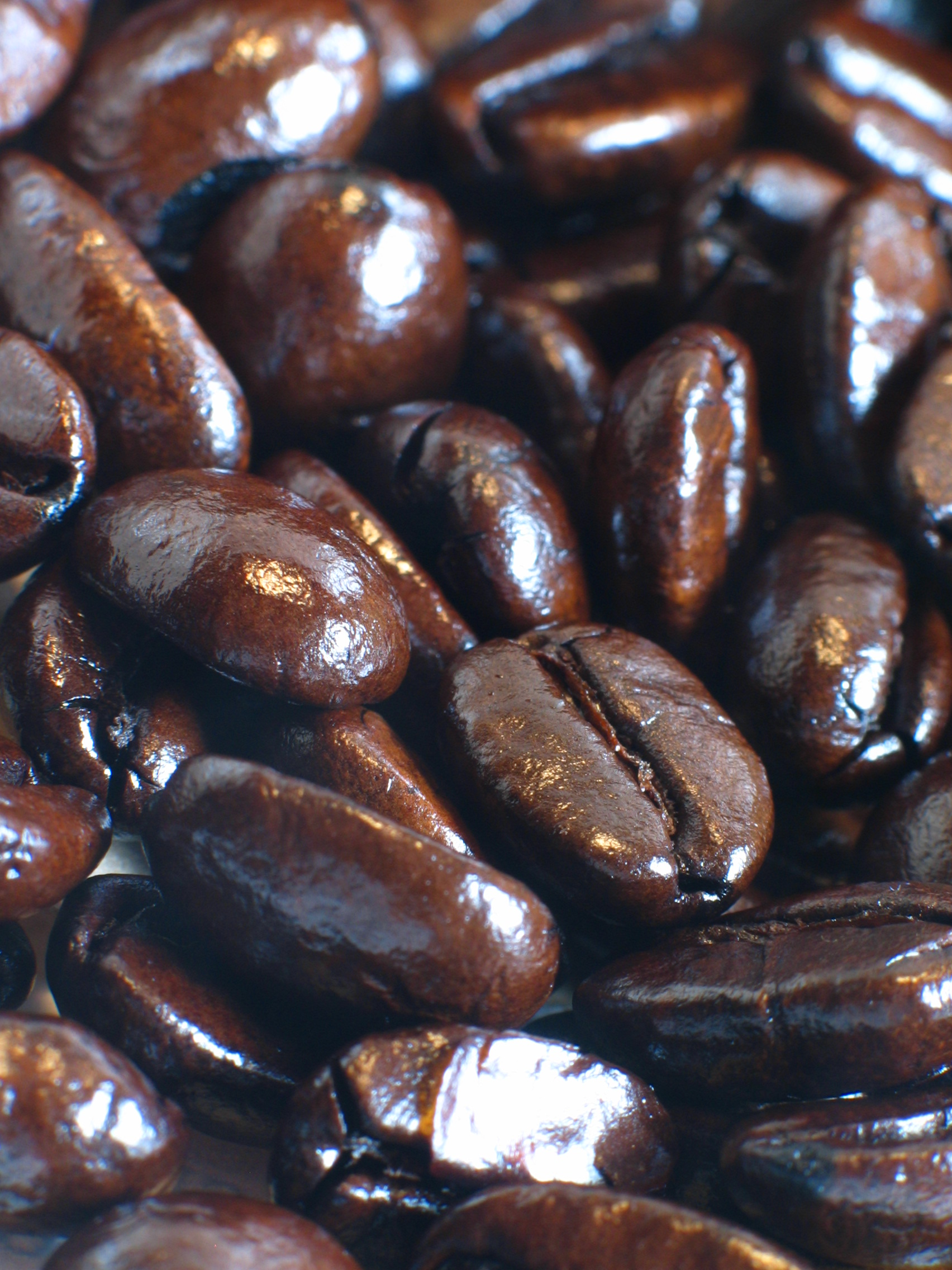
Espresso-roasted coffee beans

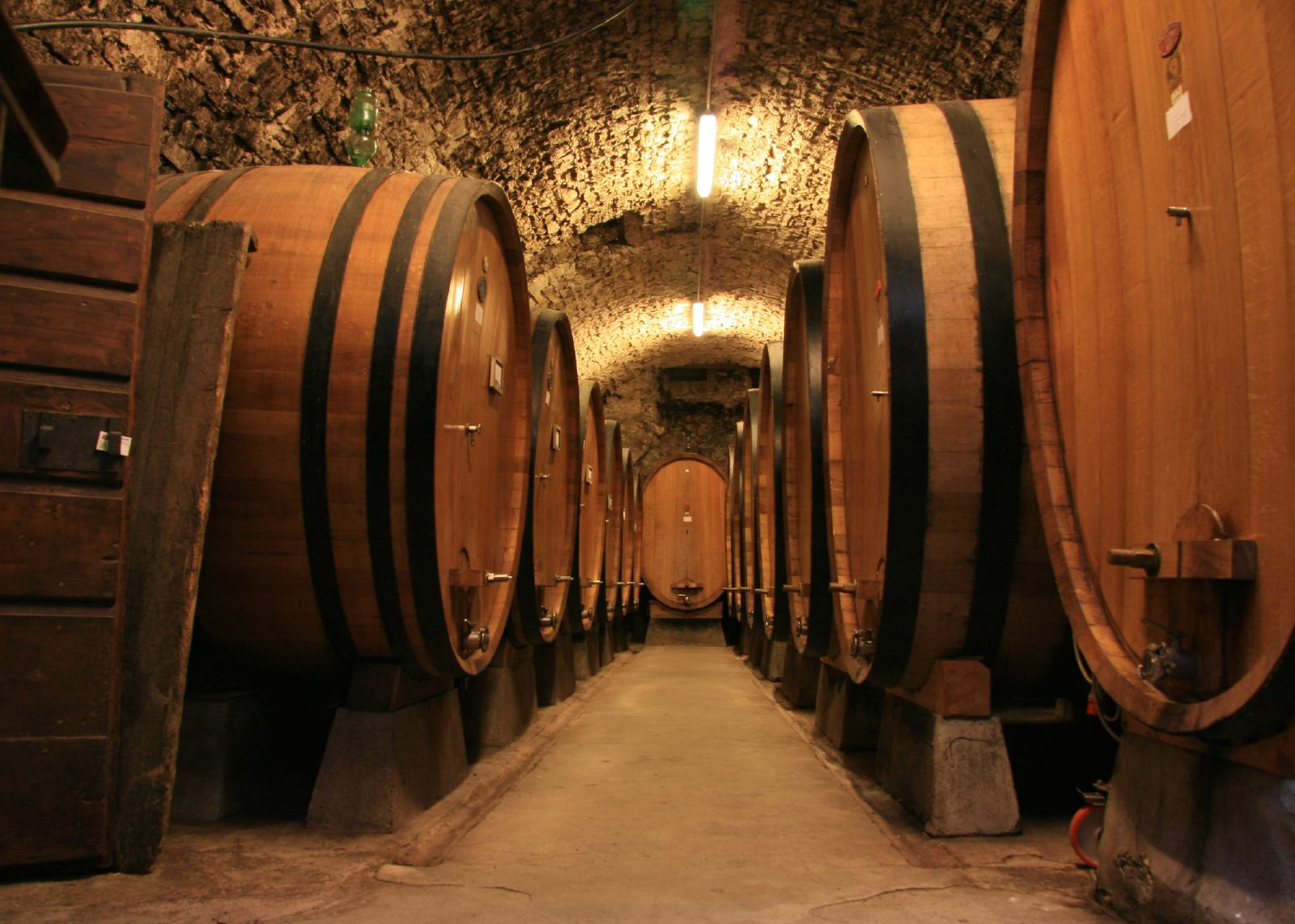
Oak barrels in a winery in Chianti, Italy

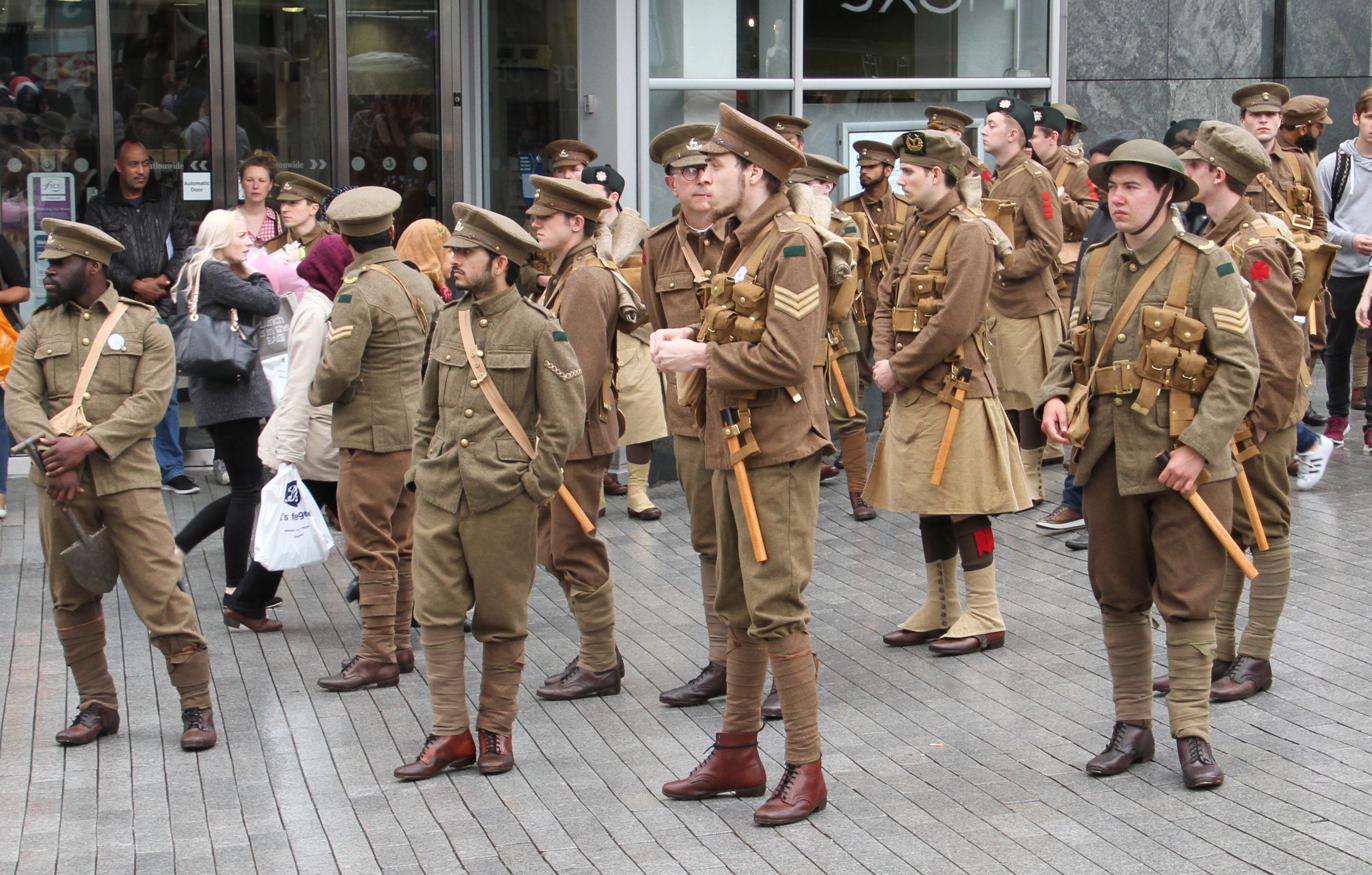
People dressed as 1st World War soldiers as part of the commemoration of the battle of the Somme. The word khaki means "earth" in the Persian language

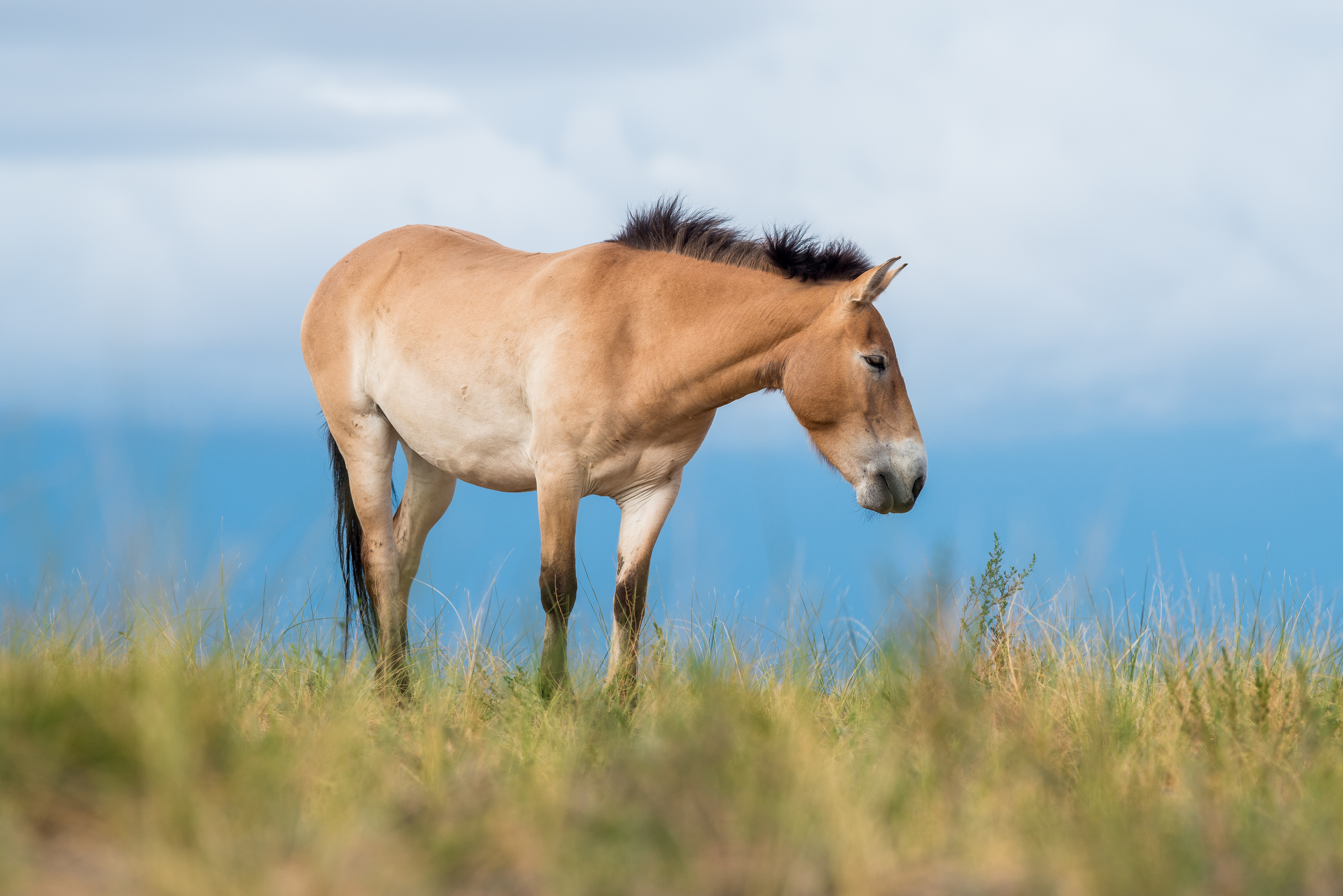
A dun-colored horse. Donn is the word for brown in the Scottish and Irish Gaelic languages

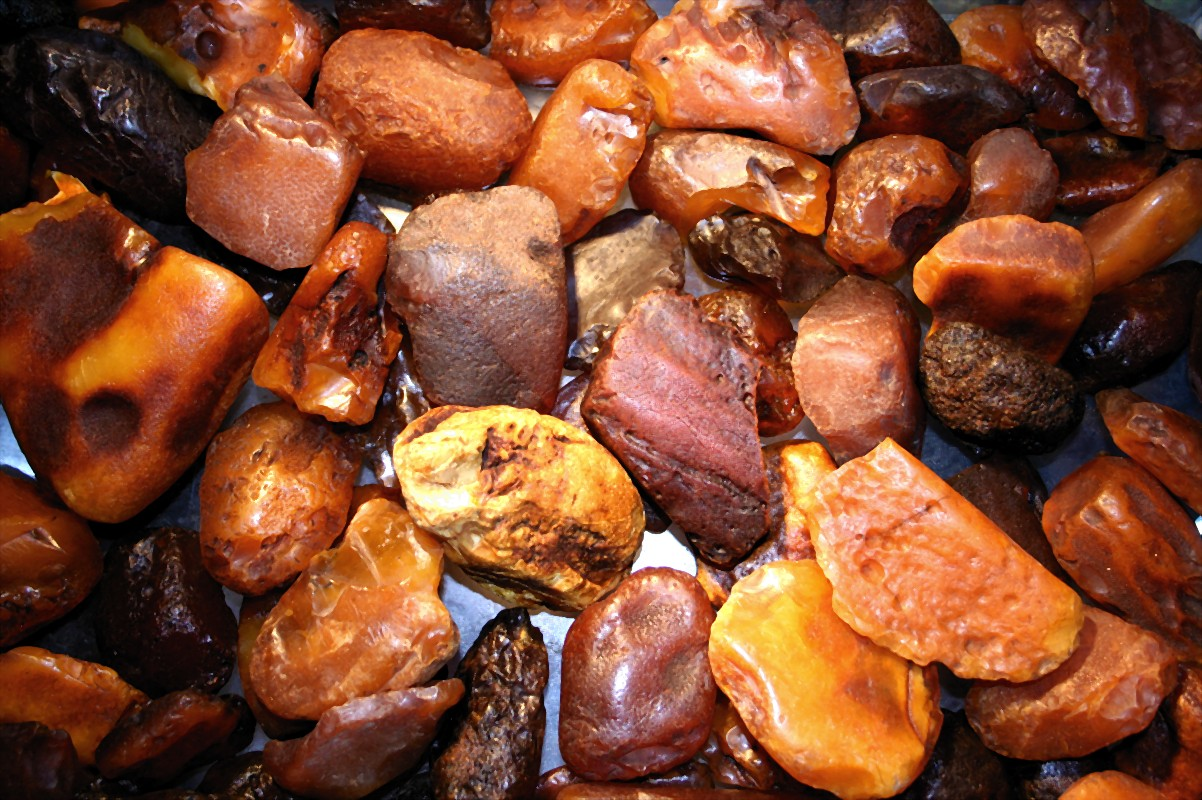
Pieces of natural amber

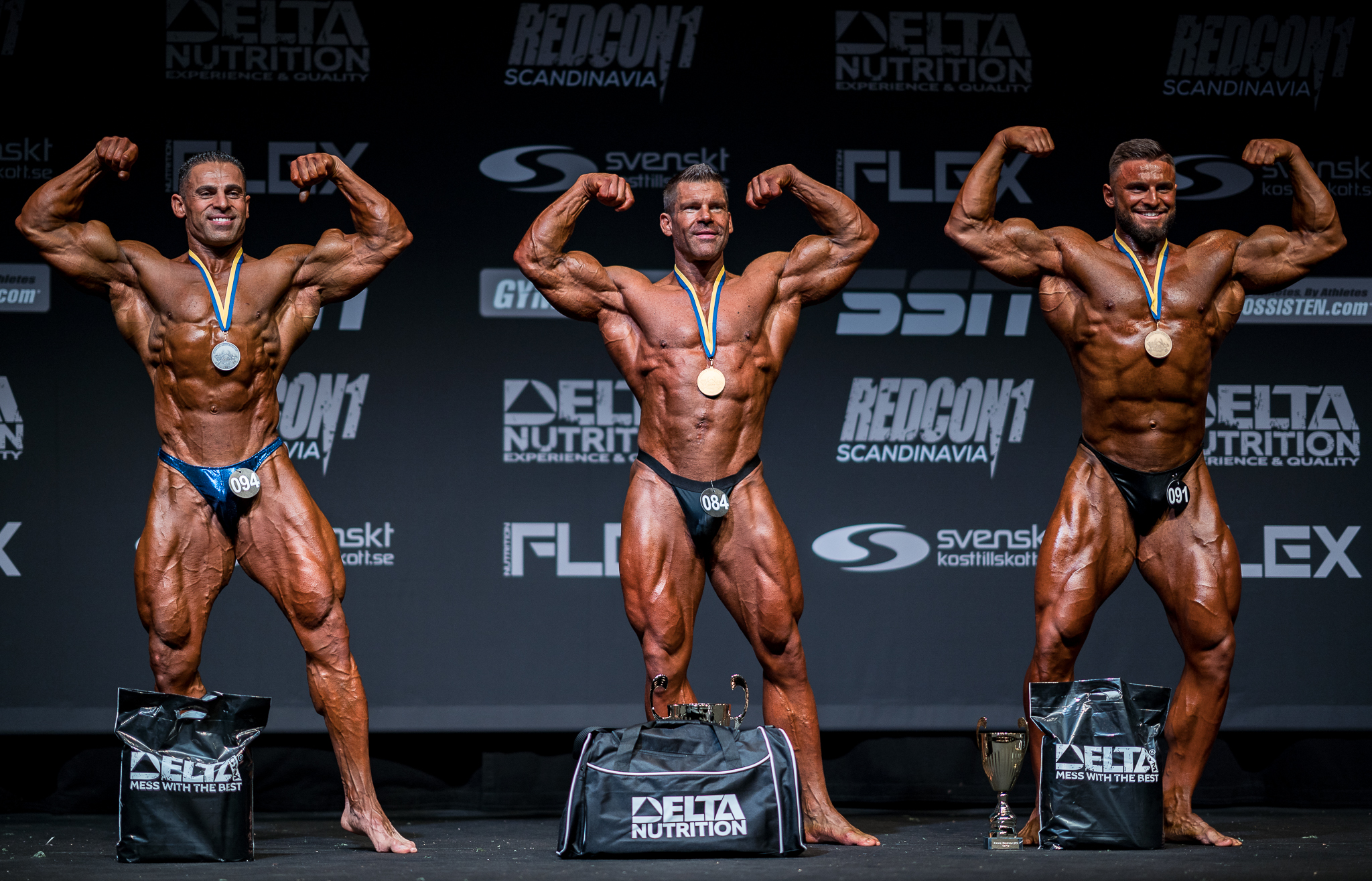
Bodybuilders who have been spray tanned

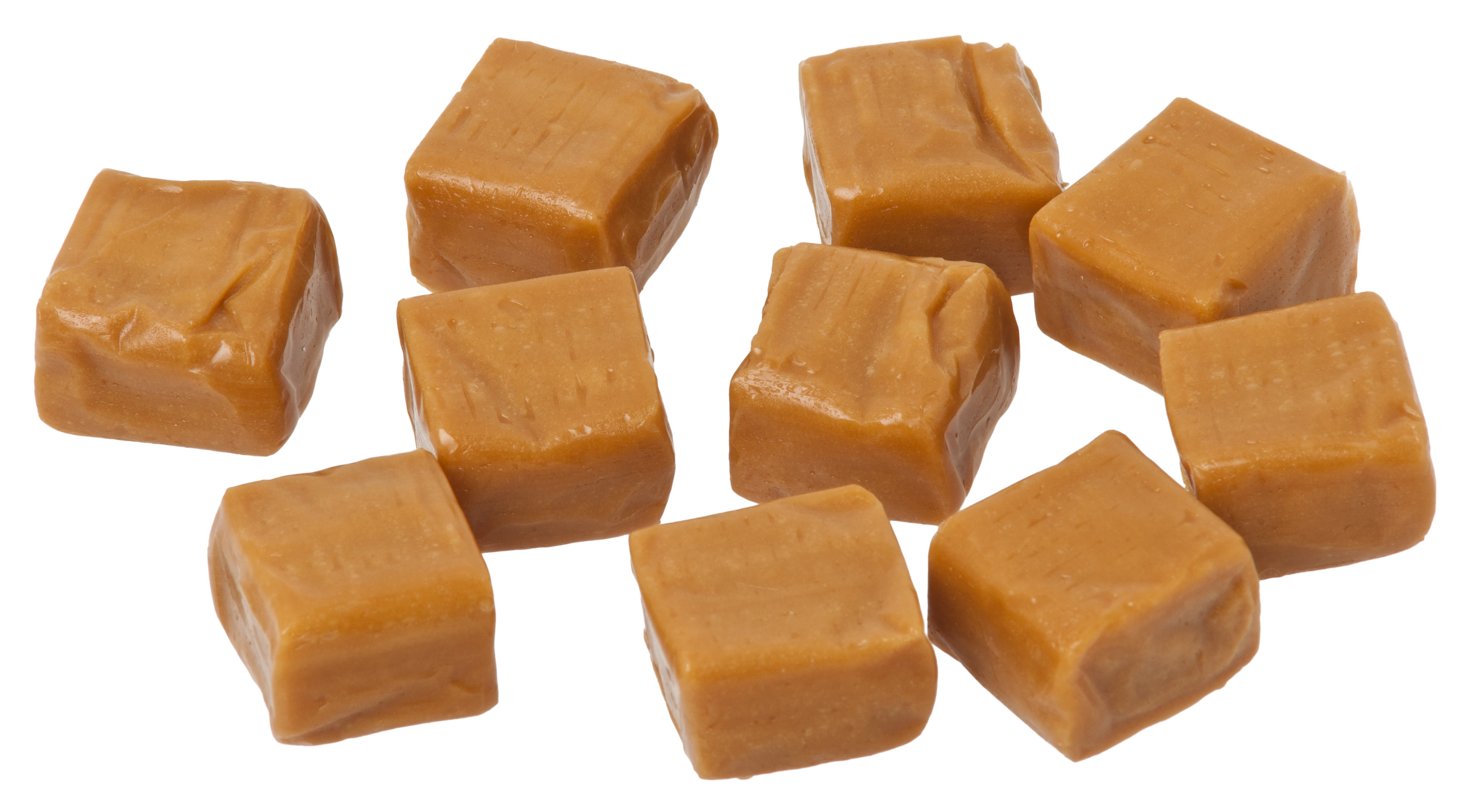
Pieces of caramel

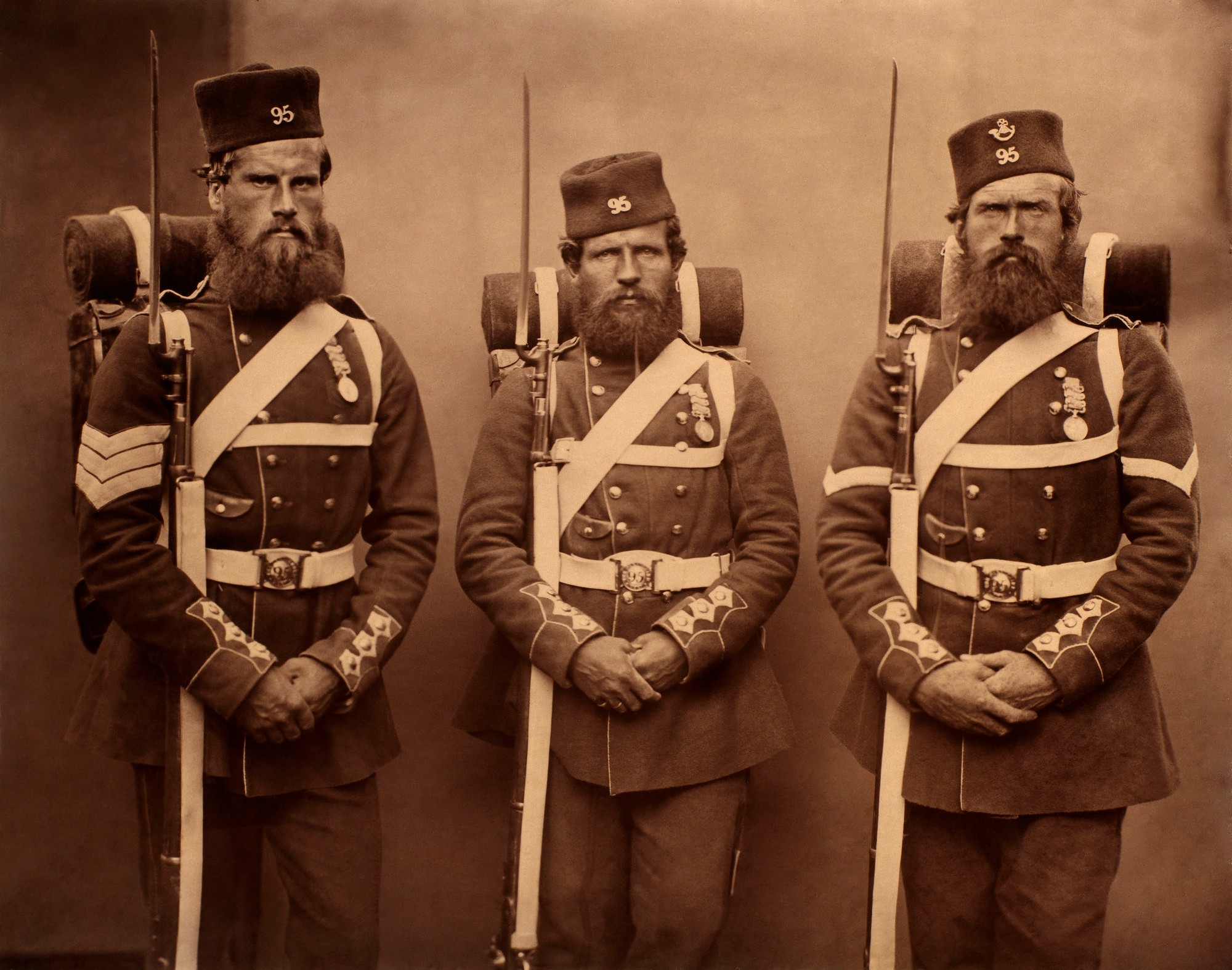
A sepia tone photograph (1895)

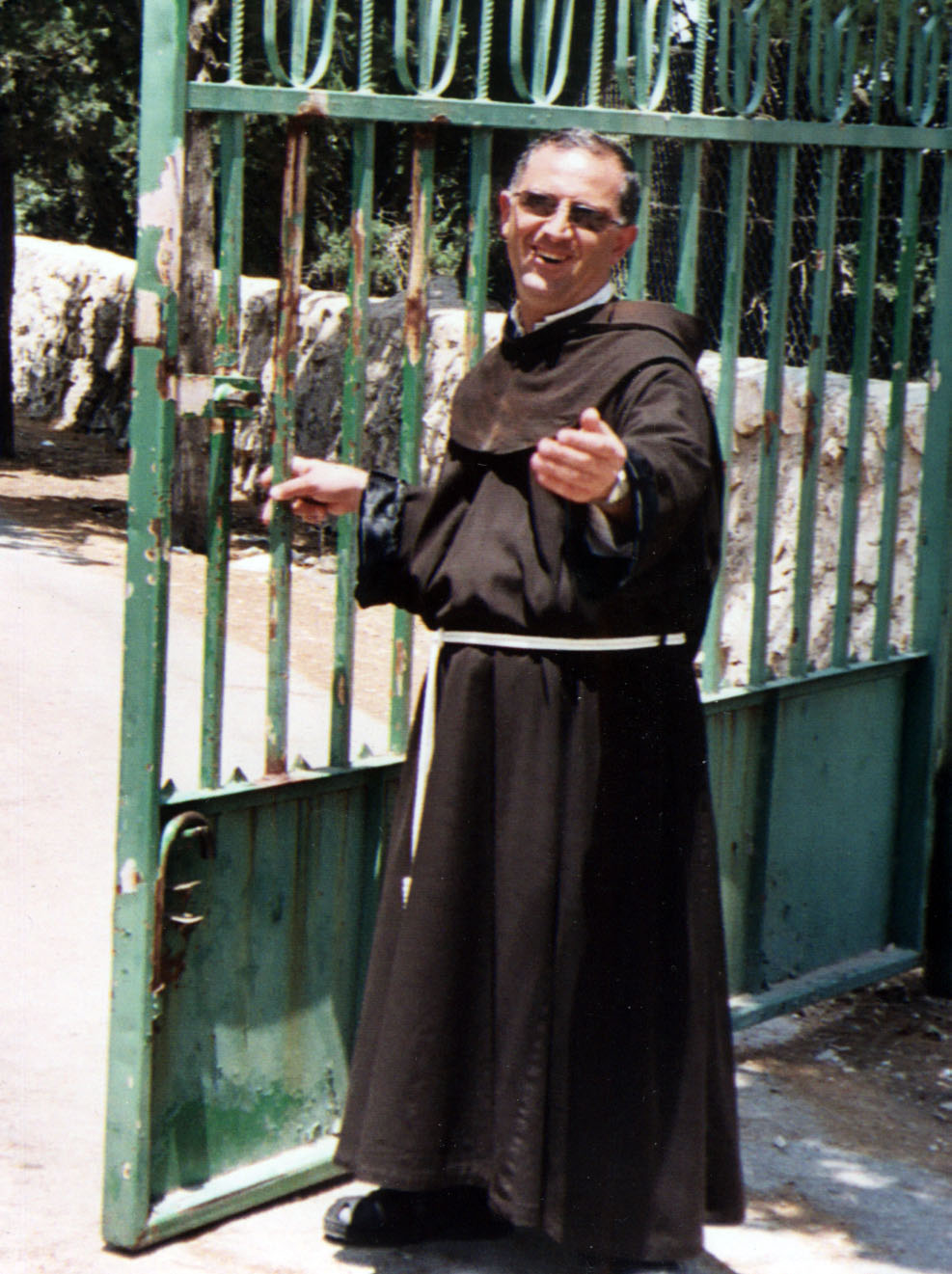
A monk of the Franciscan order. Plain brown wool symbolizes humility

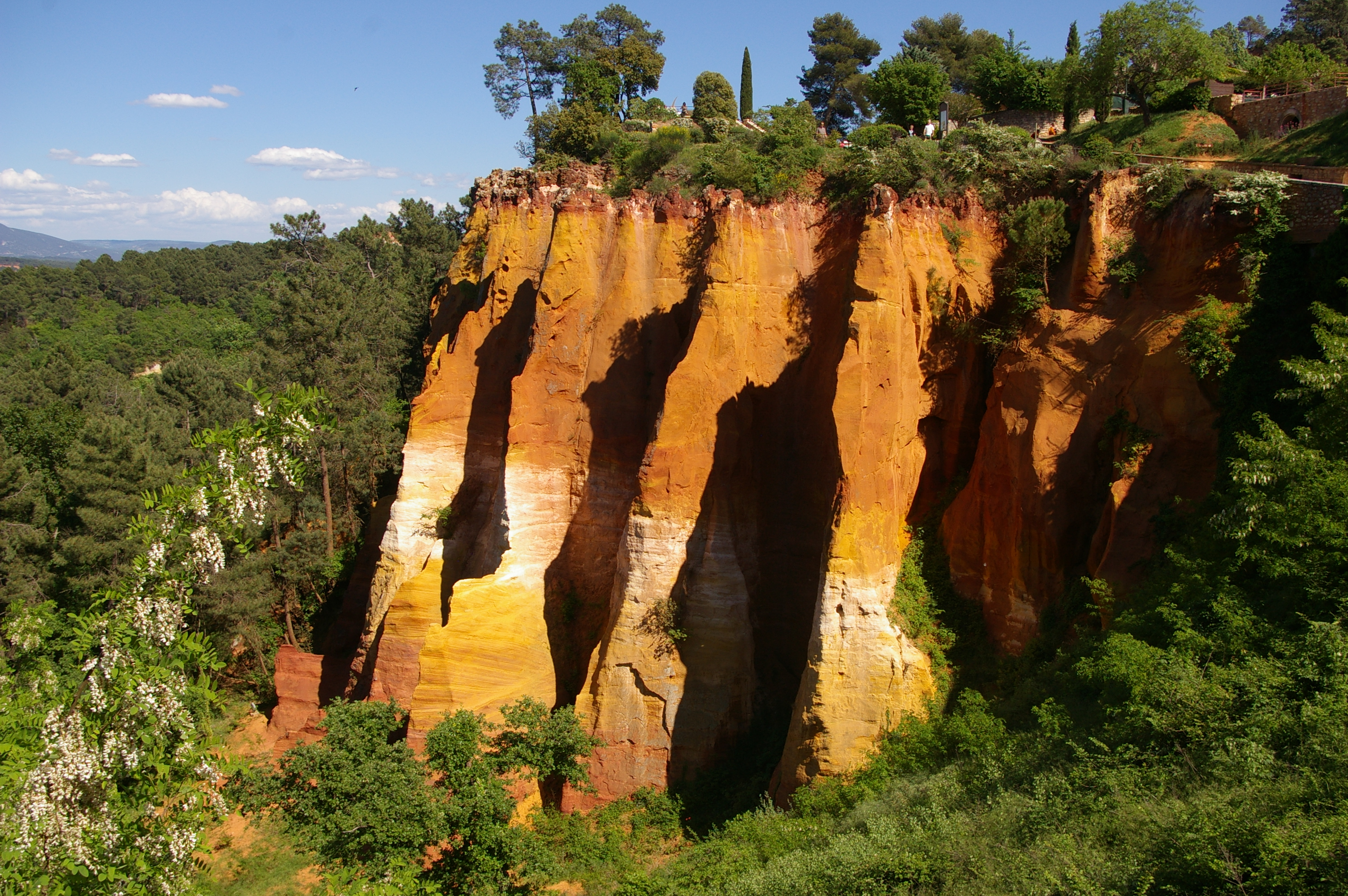
An ochre quarry in France

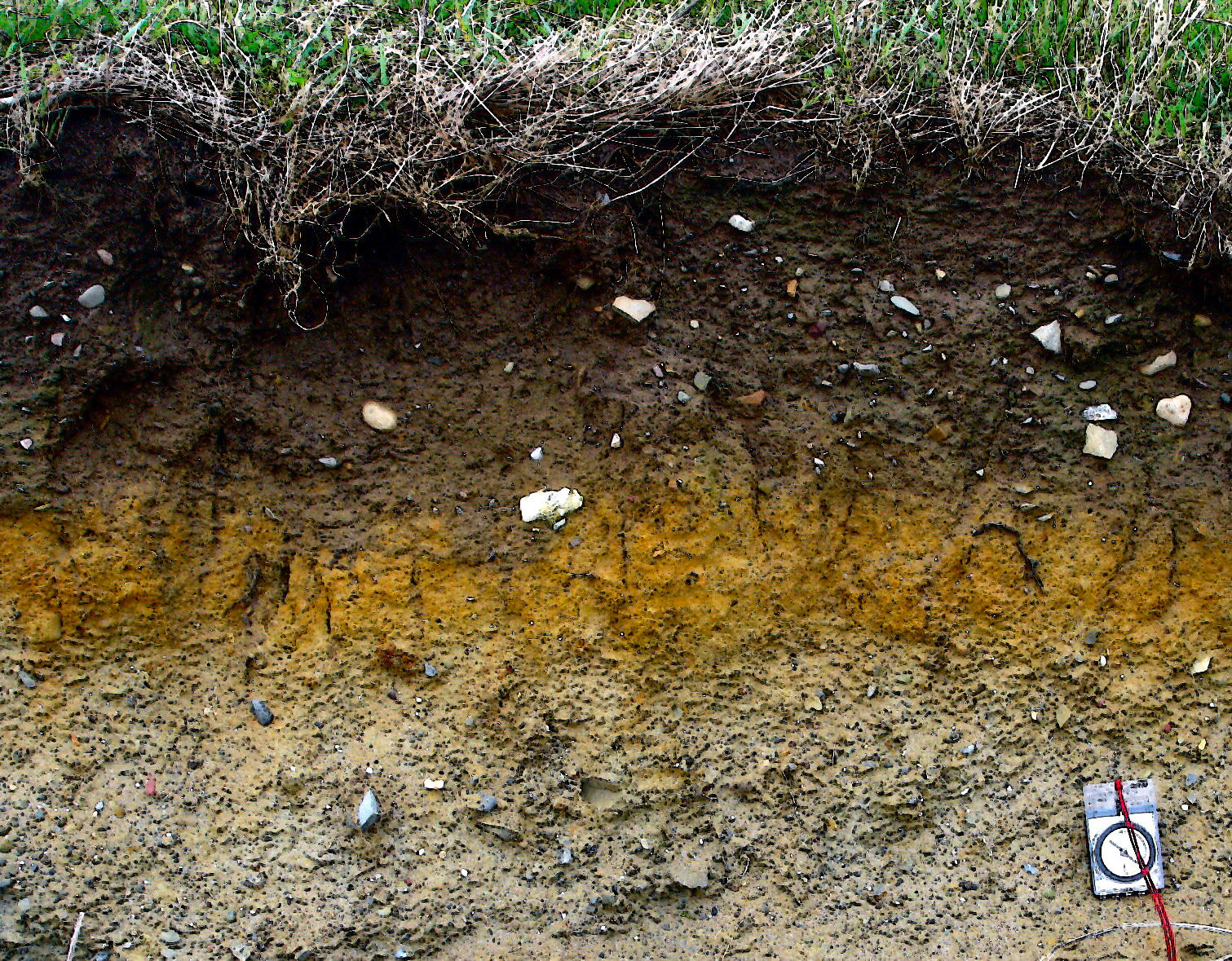
Layers of soil in Ireland. Dark brown soil usually contains a high amount of decayed organic matter

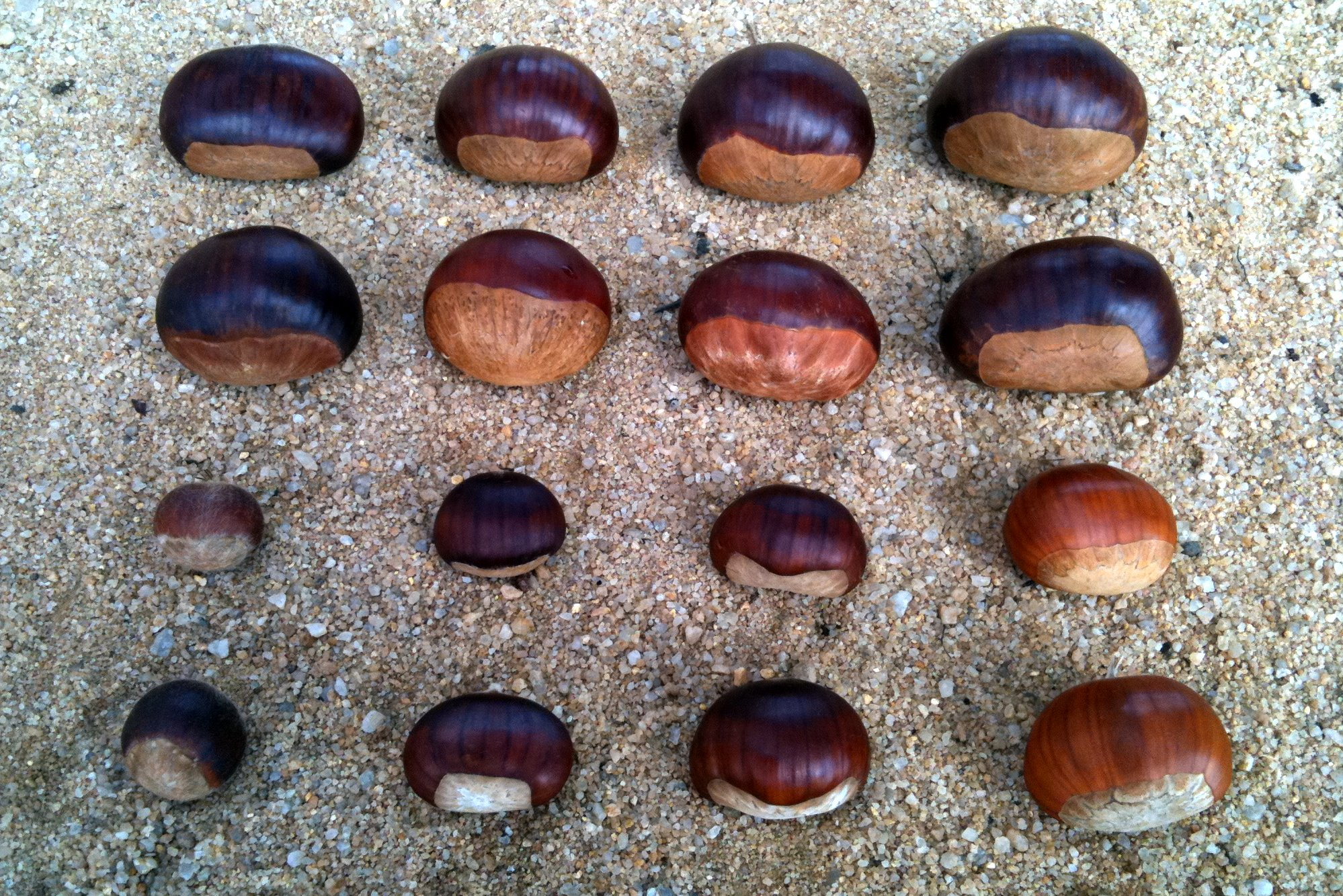
Different sorts of chestnuts

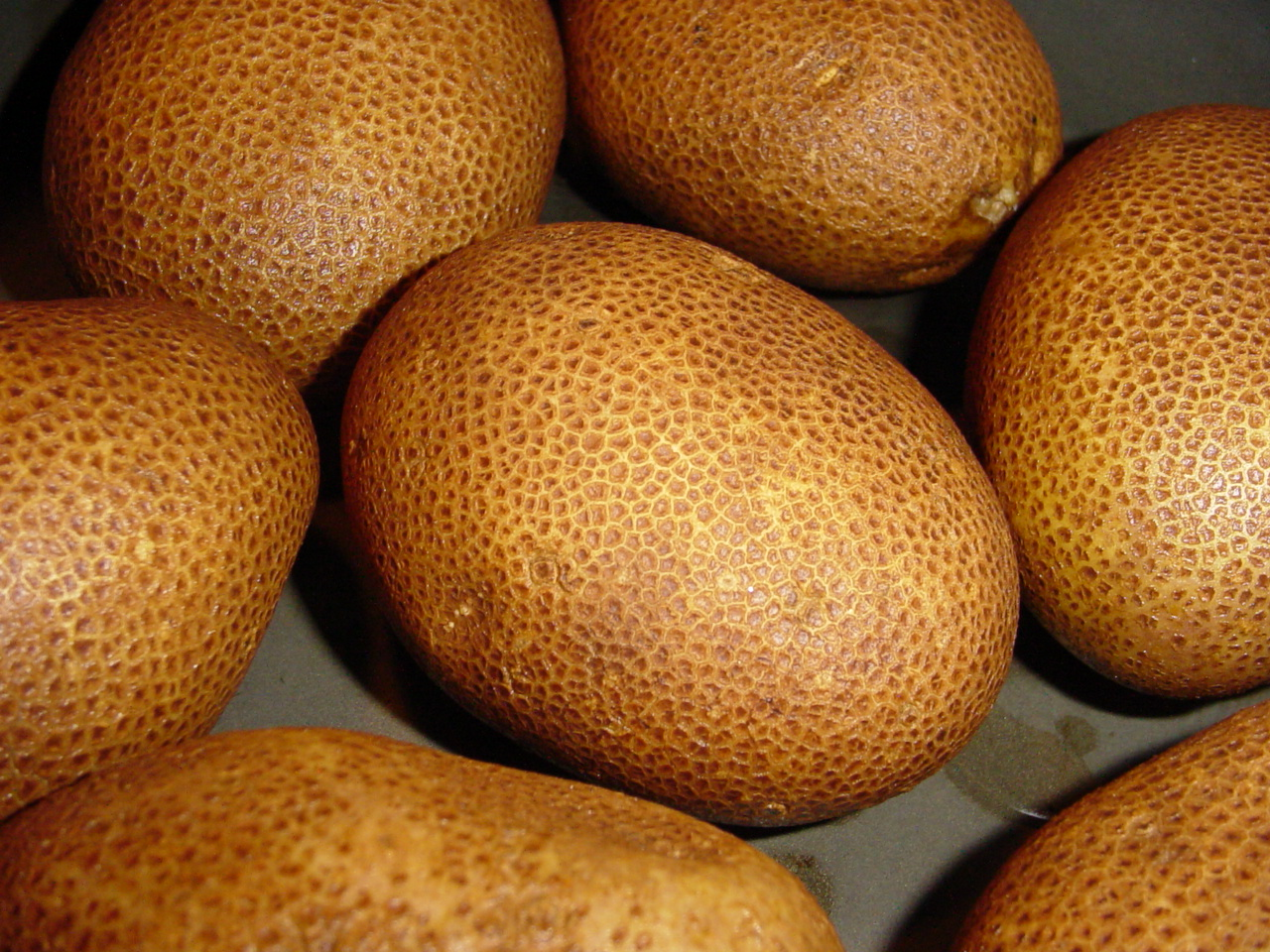
Russet potatoes take their name from the color of russet, a coarse brown homespun cloth

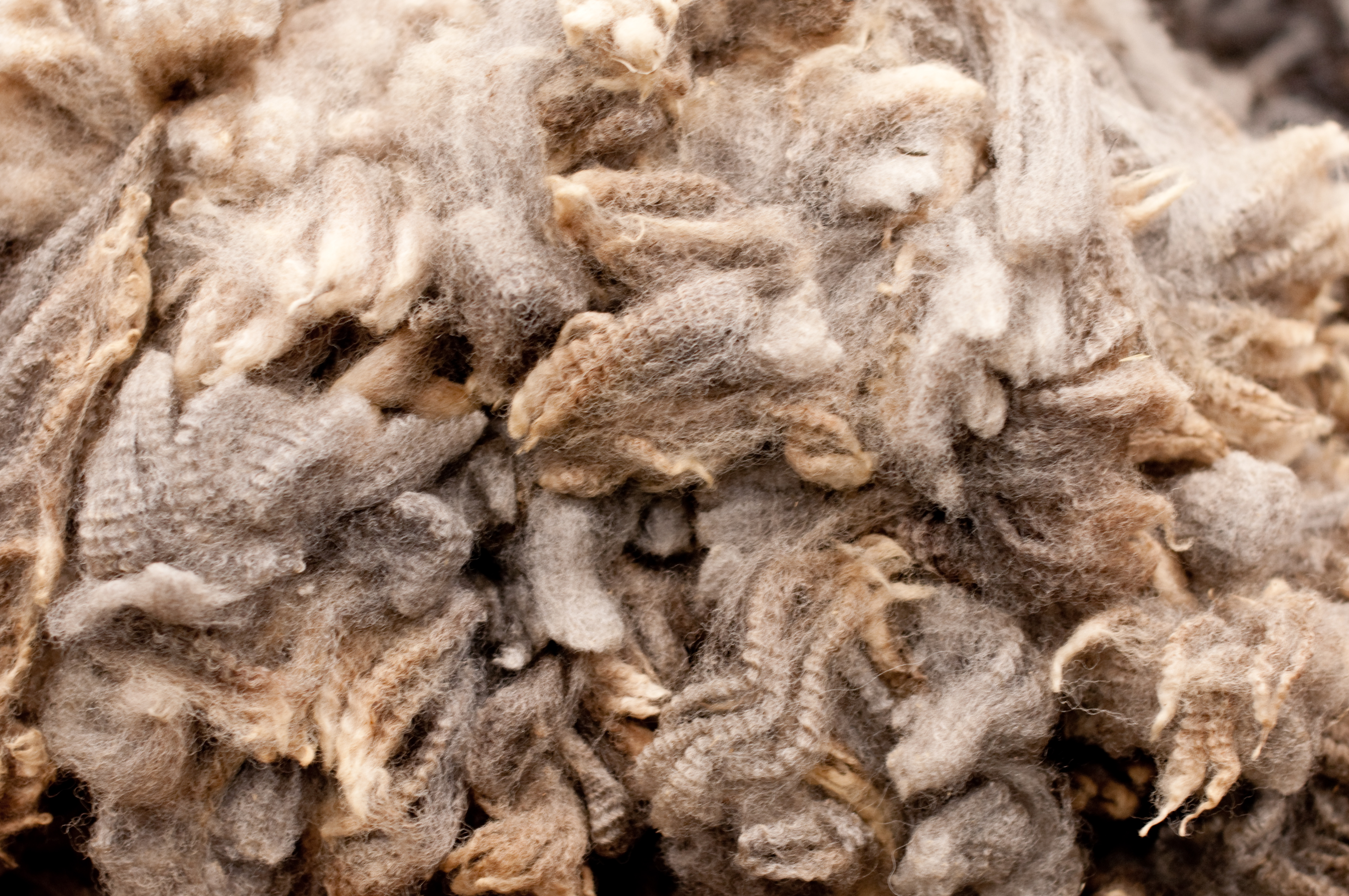
Beige is a very light brown color, taking its name from the French word for the color of natural wool

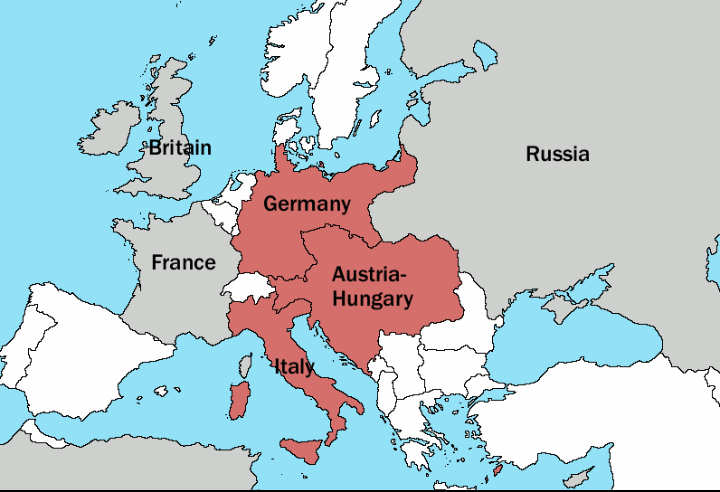
Puce is defined in the United States and UK as a brownish-purple or purple-brown color. In France, where it was invented, it is described as a dark reddish brown

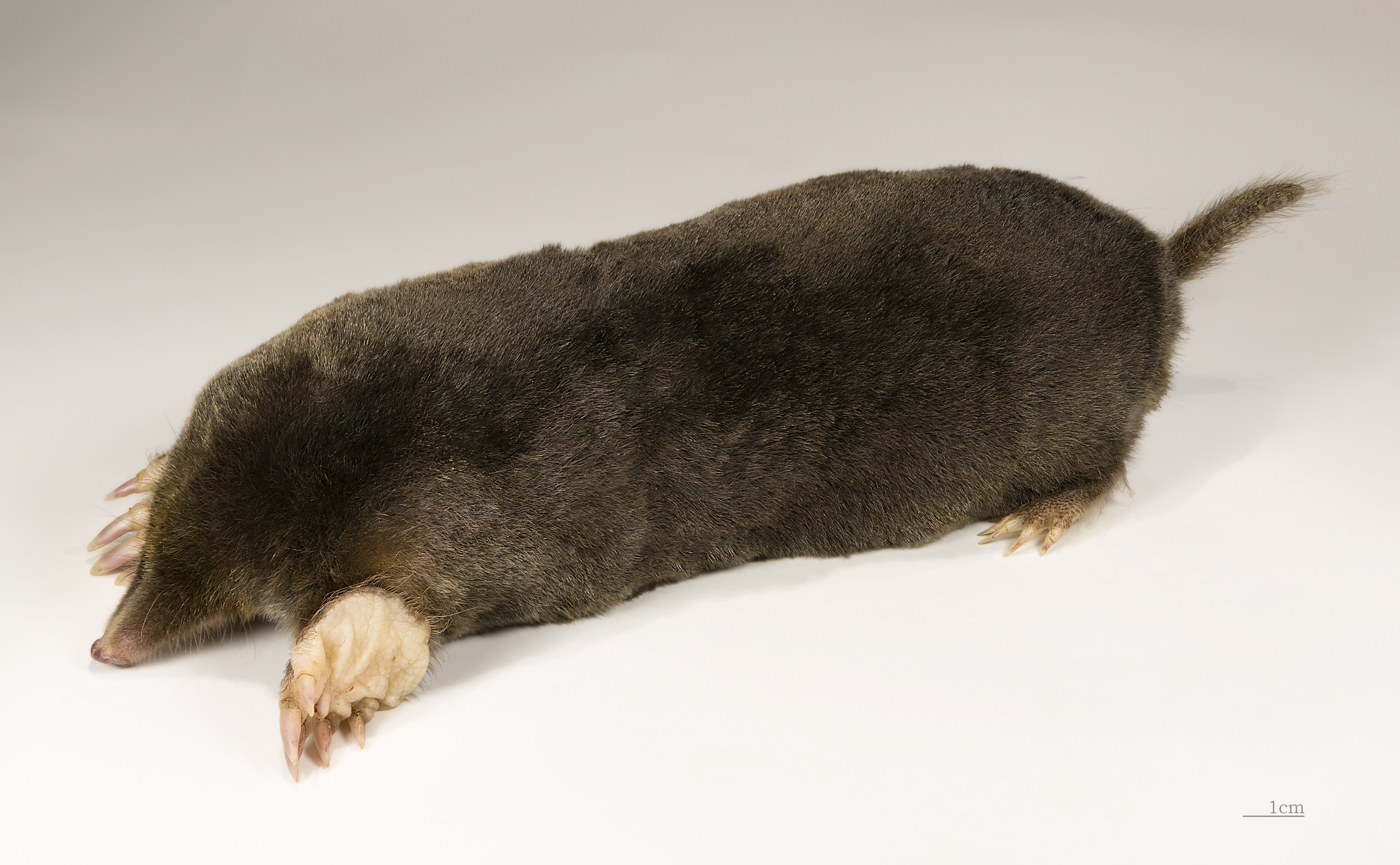
The color taupe takes its name from the French word for the European Mole

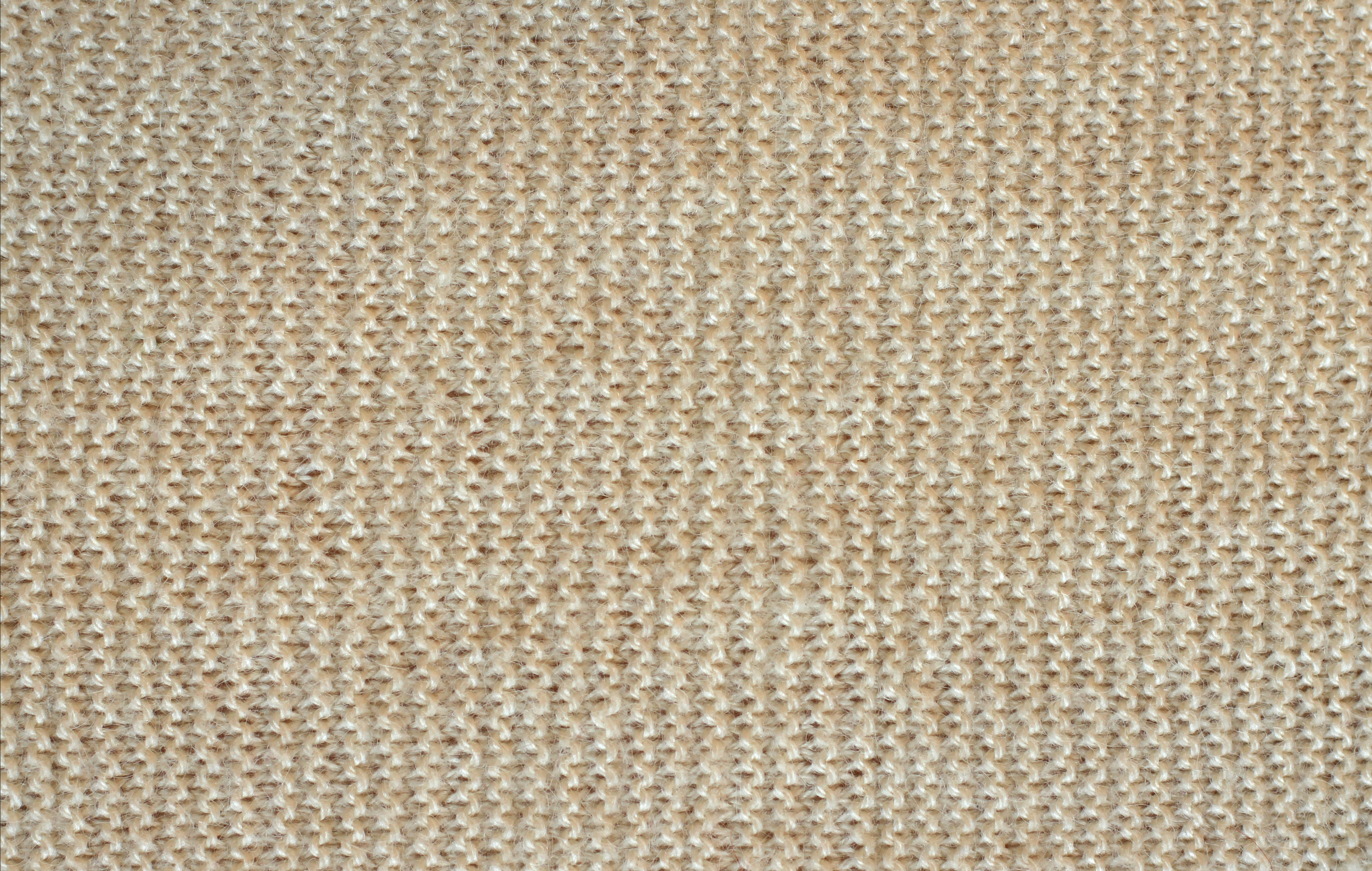
The color drab is a dull light brown, which takes its name from drap, the old French word for undyed wool cloth. It is best known for the olive-green shade called olive drab, formerly worn by U.S. soldiers. Drab has come to mean dull, lifeless and monotonous

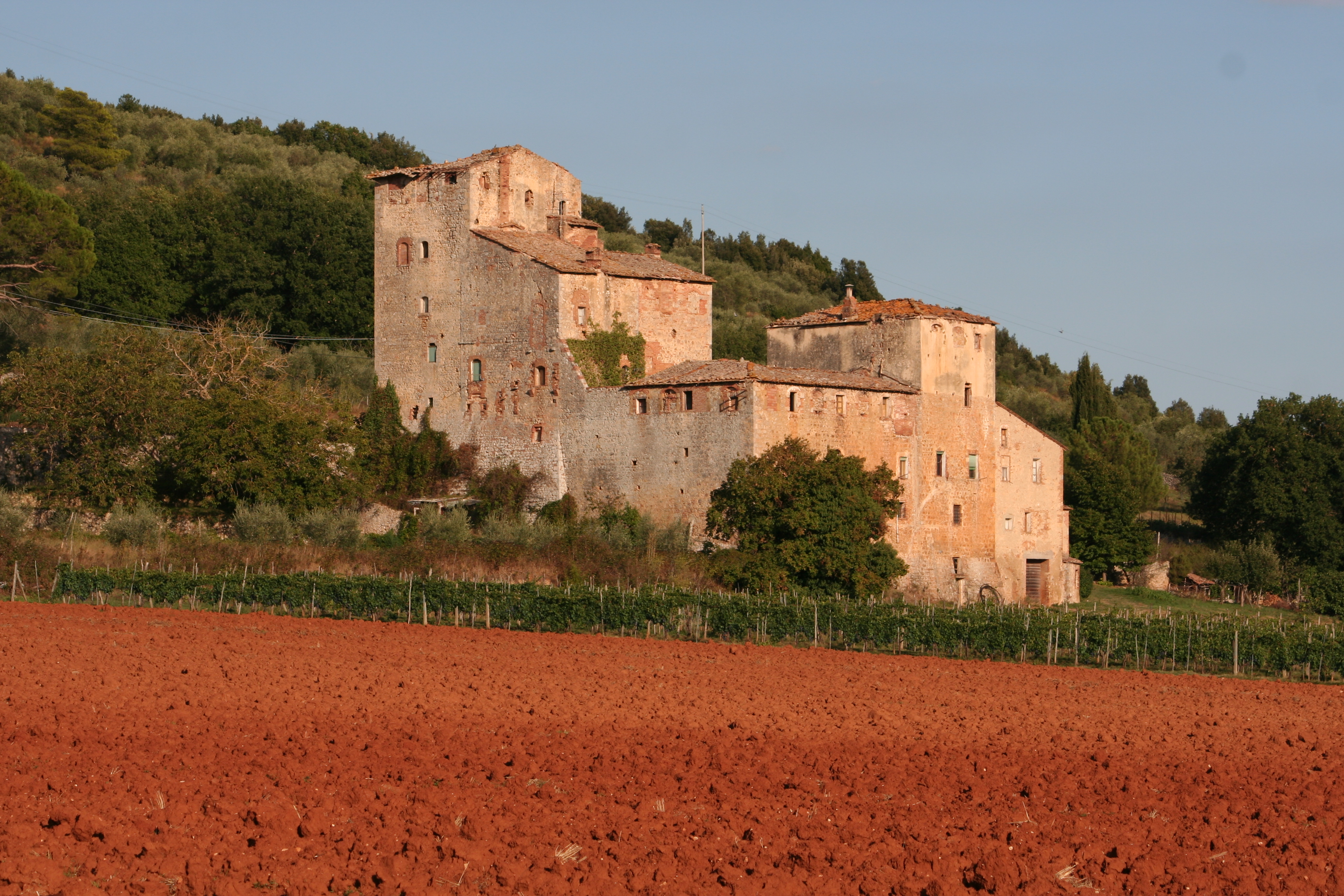
The clay soil near Siena, Italy, is the color called raw sienna

== See also ==
- Shades of brown
- List of colors
- Primary colors
