= Tawny (colour) =

Light brown to brownish-orange colour

Tawny (Tenné)

Colour coordinates
- Hex triplet: #CD5700
- sRGB^{B} (r, g, b): (205, 87, 0)
- HSV (h, s, v): (25°, 100%, 80%)
- CIELCh_{uv} (L, C, h): (52, 108, 25°)
- Source: Maerz and Paul
- ISCC–NBS descriptor: Deep orange
- B: Normalized to [0–255] (byte)

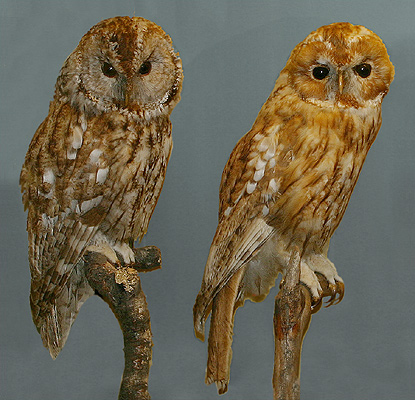
The tawny owl (Strix aluco) gives an example of tawny used as an adjective in a name. Latin scientific names may use the adjective fulvus (or variations), meaning tawny or fulvous. An example is Cinnycerthia fulva, the binomial name of the fulvous wren.

Tawny (also called tenné) is a light brown to brownish-orange colour.

== Etymology ==
The word means "tan-colored", from Anglo-Norman tauné "associated with the brownish-yellow of tanned leather", from Old French tané "to tan hides", from Medieval Latin tannare, from tannum "crushed oak bark", used in tanning leather, probably from a Celtic source (e.g. Breton tann, "oak tree").

== Electronic definitions of tawny ==
A digitised version of the 1912 book Color Standards And Color Nomenclature lists tawny as AE6938, tawny-olive as 826644 or 967117, ochraceous-tawny as BE8A3D or 996515, and vinaceous-tawny as B4745E.

HP Labs' Online Color Thesaurus, which lists colours found through their Color Naming Experiment, gives tawny as CC7F3B, noting it is "rarely used", and lists its synonyms as: light chocolate, caramel, light brown, and camel.

Dictionary of Color lists tawny as AE6938 or A67B5B, and tawny birch as A87C6D, A67B5B or 958070. It also lists "lion tawny" (which it also refers to as just "lion") as C19A6B or 826644. Orange tawny is listed as CB6D51.

Resene RGB Values List includes "Resene Tawny Port" as 105, 37, 69 (#692545), while Resene-2007-rgb lists tawny port as 100, 58, 72 (#643A48).

While tan is defined since HTML4 and elsewhere, the colour names tawny, tenné and fulvous do not appear in the standard web colours used by HTML, CSS, and SVG. Most standard X11 colour name files also do not have these names. However, many colour lists include "Tenné (Tawny)" as #CD5700.

The proprietary Pantone TC colour system includes Tawny Olive, Tawny Birch, Tawny Brown, Tawny Orange, and Tawny Port. It also has several shades of tan: Apricot Tan, Copper Tan, Rose Tan, Tan, Pastel Rose Tan, and Indian Tan.

The colour burnt orange, having the hex number CC5500, is sometimes considered to be a close approximation to tawny. The colour tan may also be considered synonymous with tawny, or a different shade: #D2B48C. Fulvous, meaning tawny-coloured, may also be considered synonymous or its own shade.

=== Swatches ===
#CD5700

Tawny
#CD5700

#AE6938

Tawny
(Dictionary of Color; Ridgway)
#AE6938

#A67B5B

Tawny
(Dictionary of Color)
#A67B5B

#CC7F3B

Tawny
(Online Color Thesaurus)
#CC7F3B

Related colours

#D2B48C

Tan
#D2B48C

#E48400

Fulvous
#E48400

#CC5500

Burnt orange
#CC5500

Synonyms

Colours listed as synonyms by HP Labs' Online Color Thesaurus:

#cc7f33

Light chocolate
#cc7f33

#bc7a3d

Caramel
#bc7a3d

#B5651D

Light brown
#B5651D

#b77f4c

Camel
#b77f4c

Variations

#826644

Tawny-olive
(Ridgway)
#826644

#967117

Tawny-olive
(Ridgway)
#967117

#BE8A3D

Ochraceous-tawny (Ridgway)
#BE8A3D

#996515

Ochraceous-tawny (Ridgway)
#996515

#B4745E

Vinaceous-tawny (Ridgway)
#B4745E

#A87C6D

Tawny birch
(Dictionary of Color)
#A87C6D

#A67B5B

Tawny birch
(Dictionary of Color)
#A67B5B

#958070

Tawny birch
(Dictionary of Color)
#958070

#C19A6B

Lion tawny
(Dictionary of Color)
#C19A6B

#826644

Lion tawny
(Dictionary of Color)
#826644

#CB6D51

Orange tawny
(Dictionary of Color)
#CB6D51

#692545

Resene Tawny Port
#692545

#643A48

Tawny port
(Resene-2007)
#643A48

== See also ==
- Fulvous
- Tan (color)
- Tenné, the colour used in heraldry
- Lion (color)
- Camel (color)
- Fallow (color)
- List of colors
- Buff (colour)
