= Ecru =

Color of unbleached linen or silk

Colour coordinates
- Hex triplet: #C2B280
- sRGB^{B} (r, g, b): (194, 178, 128)
- HSV (h, s, v): (45°, 34%, 76%)
- CIELCh_{uv} (L, C, h): (73, 39, 71°)
- Source: ISCC-NBS
- ISCC–NBS descriptor: Grayish yellow
- B: Normalized to [0–255] (byte)

Ecru (/ˈɛkruː/ EK-roo, or /ˈeɪkruː/ AY-kroo) is a grayish yellow or cream colour. It initially indicated the colour of unbleached linen (approximately #FEFEE0 ), and some English dictionaries still define it this way. However, over the years, it has also come to be used for a much darker color.

Ecru comes from the French word écru for the color of unbleached linen, and the word means "raw, unbleached" in French. It has also been known as "the colour of silk".

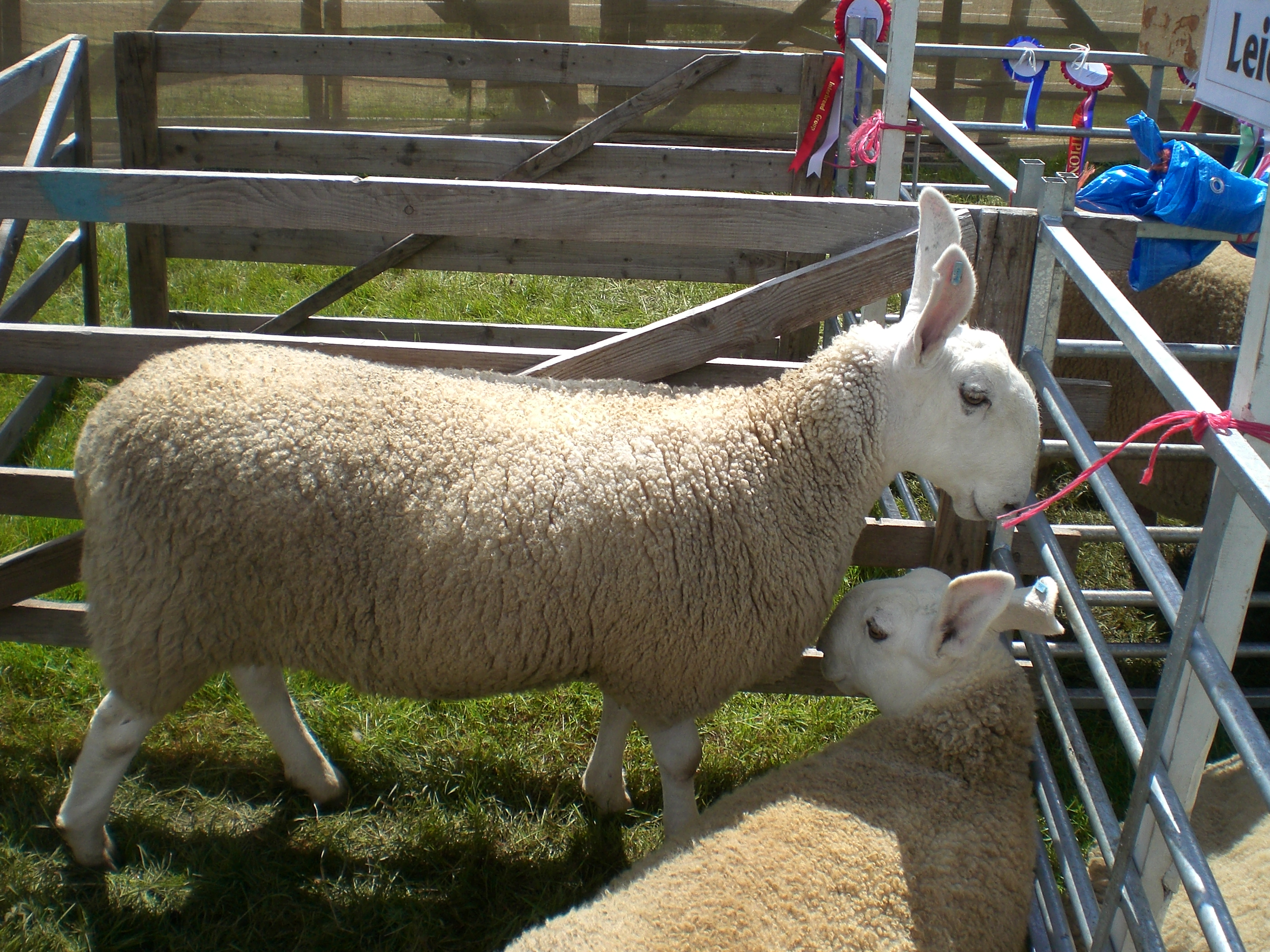
Some Border Leicester sheep with ecru wool

Traditionally, ecru was considered a shade of beige. Beginning in the 19th century it became more precisely defined as "a grayish yellow that is greener and paler than chamois or old ivory".

The normalized colour coordinates for ecru are identical to sand, which was first recorded as a colour name in English in 1627.

== See also ==
- Lists of colors
