= Earth tone =

Any of a palette of colors similar to natural materials and landscapes

Earth tone is a term used to describe a palette of colors that are similar to natural materials and landscapes. These colors are inspired by the earth's natural hues, including browns, greens, grays, and other warm and muted shades such as blue. Earth tones were popular in the 1970s and early 1980s during the environmental movement, as people sought to reconnect with nature and embrace more natural and organic lifestyles. In the mid-late 1980s, earth tones were supplanted by the neon pastels of Memphis Design.

People often connect earth tones with warmth, comfort, and steadiness, which is why they are commonly used in interior design, fashion, and graphic design. They are also versatile, making them suitable for a wide range of applications, from rustic and traditional to modern and minimalist. While earth tones are often connected with nature, they can also be used in more urban and industrial settings to create a sense of harmony and balance. In recent years, earth tones have become increasingly popular in graphic design and branding, as companies seek to convey a sense of authenticity, sustainability, and environmental responsibility.

== Practicality ==
The practicality of earth tone lies in its versatility and ability to blend with different colors and styles.

One of the main advantages of earth tone is that they create a calming and soothing atmosphere, making them a popular choice in interior design. They are also considered timeless and can give a sense of grounding and stability to a space. Earth tones are also practical in fashion, as they are easy to mix and match with other colors, and can be used to create a range of looks from casual to formal.

== Color palette ==
The color palette of earth tone typically includes warm and muted shades of white, brown, tan, gray, beige, taupe, khaki, green, olive, moss, and rust. These colors are often used together in a variety of combinations to create a connected and natural-looking palette. In interior design, earth tones can be used to create a calming and inviting ambiance, while in fashion, they can add a touch of elegance and experience to any outfit.

Other colors that may be included in the earth tone palette are muted shades of orange, red, and yellow. These colors are inspired by the colors of the earth and can be found in natural materials like clay, sandstone, and rusted metal. Overall, the earth tone palette is characterized by its warm, natural, and calming hues that are versatile and timeless in design.

== Psychological and psychophysiological effects of natural colors ==
=== Cool colors ===
The psychology of cool colors pertains to the effects of certain hues on human emotions and perceptions. Cool colors, such as blues, greens, and purples, have been found to recede from the eye, creating an illusion of depth and making a space appear larger and more open. As a result, these colors are often used in smaller rooms to increase the perceived size of the area. Furthermore, cool colors have a calming effect on individuals, evoking feelings of relaxation and tranquility. Consequently, they are often utilized in spaces intended for rest and rejuvenation, such as bathrooms and bedrooms.

=== Warm colors ===
The psychology of warm colors concerns the impact of certain hues on human emotions and perceptions. Warm colors, such as reds, oranges, and yellows, are known to create a sense of warmth and comfort, and can even provide the illusion of heat. These colors have a tendency to advance toward the eye, making them particularly effective in larger spaces, as they can create a feeling of coziness and security.

Additionally, warm colors are often associated with stimulation and activity, evoking strong emotions and promoting movement. As such, these colors are well-suited for environments such as gyms and living rooms, where physical activity and social interactions are encouraged.

== Shades of earth tone ==
Overall, colors in earth tone are considered to be the colors of nature like sea, sky, land, and tree. Any color that is mixed with gray is considered an earth tone. Earth tone also includes any shade or tint color as well as brown, green, yellow, orange, or gray. For instance, earth tone colors are as follows:

Examples of earth tone shades
Color display	Color number	Color name
	#555142	forest floor
	#434237	forest night
	#836539	dirt brown
	#a29259	desert yellow
	#d4cc9a	dusty yellow
	#f0d696	straw yellow
	#cfbfb9	musk dusk
	#cec5ad	prairie dusk
	#8d8468	brown gray
	#6e6969	charcoal gray
	#885132	charred clay
	#3d2b1f	bistre
	#302621	wood bark
	#4f1507	earth brown
	#712f2c	auburn
	#44382b	bear brown
	#37290e	brown tumbleweed
	#0e695f	evergreen forest
	#0b5509	forest
	#184a45	forest biome
	#448811	kelp forest
	#002200	forest night
	#0a481e	pine green
	#005f56	alpine green
	#4b6d41	artichoke
	#00cc99	caribbean green
	#5e6737	cedar
	#749551	drab green
	#67ad83	seagrass
	#99bb33	moss garden
	#638b27	moss green
	#6e9377	watercress
	#f1faea	white sulfur
	#00626f	blue lagoon
	#53734c	irish clover
	#8caa95	peaslake
	#73b7a5	turtle lake
	#5a6d77	rolling sea
	#2d3032	cod gray
	#848585	dover gray
	#c5c6c7	glacier gray
	#9ca0a6	gray wolf
	#f5f5f5	white smoke
	#8f9aa4	canadian lake
	#4e5481	dusk
	#7eb7bf	waterway
	#3ab0a2	waterfall
	#0f3b57	blue opal
	#f4e8e1	jasmine flower
	#563d5d	english violet
	#8f4c3a	burled redwood
	#3e0007	charred brown
	#6d1008	chestnut brown
	#be7249	orange lily
	#bf9b0c	ochre

== Applications in design practice ==
Nature always relates to humans both physically and mentally. That is the reason it is the inspiration for many designers to apply natural elements including earth tone (natural color palette), organic shape, and natural texture to design areas of practice. The trend of natural design is influenced by the awareness of global warming and environmental problems.

=== Graphic design ===
It is very usual in graphic design to apply an earth tone palette. Earth tone is effective for making the audience relate to a design naturally. To soften a solid design and make them more comfortable in appearance, an earth tone is used. Earth tone is related to modernity and minimalism. In brand identity design, earth tone is applied in many logos, websites, and brochures.

=== Fashion design ===
According to WWD weekend, earth tone had become a fashion trend in Fall 2021 in RTW (Read-to-Wear) runway, including many fashion brands such as Versace, Undercover, Theopphilio, Sportmax, Simone Rocha, Schiaparelli, Roseatta Getty, Hermes, etc.[6]

=== Architecture ===
Earth tone is used by the architect to bring harmony between nature surrounding the building and the building together. The tone improves relaxation in the house and residence, and also, the atmosphere of cozy warm luxurious modern. Due to the fact that earth tone or natural color is comfortable and pleasing to the eye. Earth tone can complement natural light that shines into the architect by softening the light.

== Applications in art practice ==
=== Painting ===
In painting, "brownness" defines earth tone. At the beginning of a painting, primitive painters used soil, animal fat, minerals, charcoal, and chalk combined to be a color around 40,000 years ago. Therefore, the first group of colors was a natural palette by themselves. And earth tone palette was very handy to mix from scratch. There are many types of earth tone artists used. For example, burnt umber is an earthy shade that is a combination of phthalo blue and ultramarine, and a permanent rose. Additionally, Vandyke brown and sepia are similar in color to old photographs and can be useful for replicating vintage effects or a monochromatic look.

=== Materials and pigments ===
The composition of earth pigments generally involves three elements: a clay base, a mineral component (iron oxide), and a secondary coloring agent. Iron oxide, which is present in different forms and shades all across the earth, is the primary coloring agent for most earth pigments. The properties of iron oxide vary, and its color is determined by the type of iron oxide used. Iron and oxygen are the two primary components of these minerals and are present in different amounts. Additionally, a secondary coloring agent such as manganese oxide, calcium, carbon, organic material, silica, limestone, or rutile (titanium dioxide) can also be present.

== See also ==
- Pastel colors
