= Shades of brown =

Varieties of the color brown

Brown

Common connotations
- Autumn, Thanksgiving, earth, dirt, chocolate

Color coordinates
- Hex triplet: #964B00
- sRGB^{B} (r, g, b): (150, 75, 0)
- HSV (h, s, v): (30°, 100%, 59%)
- CIELCh_{uv} (L, C, h): (40, 72, 31°)
- Source: ColorXS
- ISCC–NBS descriptor: Strong brown
- B: Normalized to [0–255] (byte)

Some shades of Brown
- Red Brown (X11)
- Pale Brown
- Medium Brown
- Dark Brown
- Light Brown

Shades of brown can be produced by combining red, yellow, and black pigments, or by a combination of orange and black—illustrated in the color box. The RGB color model, that generates all colors on computer and television screens, makes brown by combining red and green light at relatively low intensities, with green light being in a lesser proportion than red light. Brown color names are often imprecise, and some shades, such as beige, can refer to lighter rather than darker shades of yellow and red. Such colors are less saturated than colors perceived to be orange. Browns are usually described as light or dark, reddish, yellowish, or gray-brown. There are no standardized names for shades of brown; the same shade may have different names on different color lists, and sometimes one name (such as beige or puce) can refer to several very different colors. The X11 color list of web colors has seventeen different shades of brown, but the complete list of browns is much longer.

Brown colors are typically desaturated shades of reds, oranges, and yellows which are created on computer and television screens using the RGB color model and in printing with the CMYK color model. Browns can also be created by mixing two complementary colors from the RYB color model (combining all three primary colors). In theory, such combinations should produce black, but produce brown because most commercially available blue pigments tend to be comparatively weaker; the stronger red and yellow colors prevail, thus creating brown tones.

Displayed here are some common brown shades. Some of them are associated with (any of various types of) soil, rock, or vegetation and are thus also classifiable among the earth tones.

== Red-brown (web color "brown") ==
Red-Brown

Color coordinates
- Hex triplet: #A52A2A
- sRGB^{B} (r, g, b): (165, 42, 42)
- HSV (h, s, v): (0°, 75%, 65%)
- CIELCh_{uv} (L, C, h): (38, 94, 12°)
- Source: X11
- ISCC–NBS descriptor: Vivid red
- B: Normalized to [0–255] (byte)

The web color called "brown" is displayed as shown.

The historical and traditional name for this color is red-brown.

The color shown above at the top right at the head of this article (color #964B00) is the color normally and traditionally regarded as brown—a medium dark orange. Its h (hue) code is 30, which signifies a shade of orange. The color to the immediate right (color #A52A2A) that was chosen as the web color "brown"—a medium dark red—is the color traditionally called red-brown. That this color is a shade of red and not orange can be easily ascertained by inspecting its h (hue) code, which is 0, signifying a shade of red.

The first recorded use of red-brown as a color name in English was in 1682.

== Brown (RYB) ==
Brown (RYB)

Color coordinates
- Hex triplet: #331800
- sRGB^{B} (r, g, b): (51, 24, 0)
- HSV (h, s, v): (28°, 100%, 20%)
- CIELCh_{uv} (L, C, h): (12, 19, 36°)
- Source: RYB color system
- B: Normalized to [0–255] (byte)

Displayed at right is the color that is called brown in the RYB color model. It is an equal mix of red, yellow and blue.

== Additional variations of brown ==
=== Beaver ===
Beaver
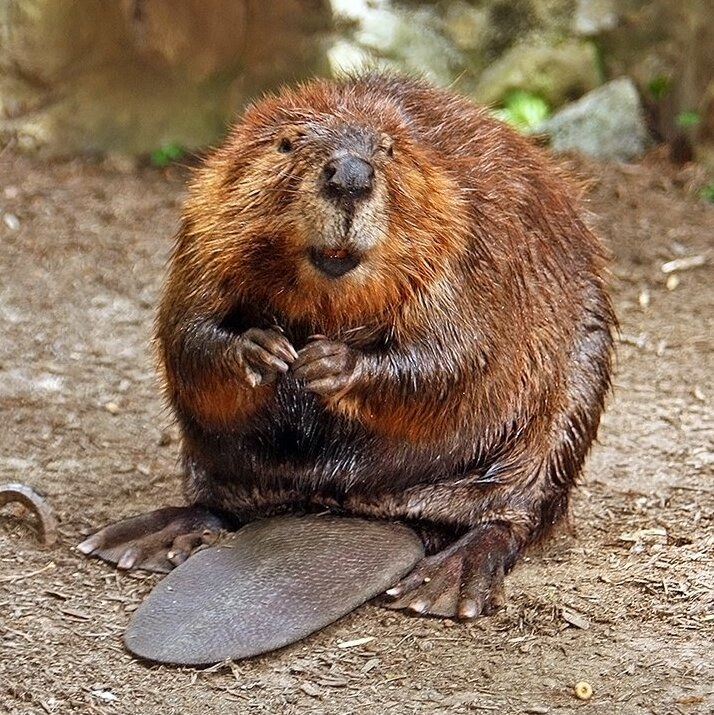
- A North American beaver

Color coordinates
- Hex triplet: #9F8170
- sRGB^{B} (r, g, b): (159, 129, 112)
- HSV (h, s, v): (22°, 30%, 62%)
- CIELCh_{uv} (L, C, h): (56, 26, 39°)
- Source: Crayola
- ISCC–NBS descriptor: Light brown
- B: Normalized to [0–255] (byte)

Beaver is a shade of brown representative of the color of a beaver. At a hue of 22, it is classified as an orange-brown.

The first recorded use of beaver as a color name in English was in 1705.

The color "beaver" was formulated as one of the Crayola colors in 1998.

Etymologically, it's believed that the words "brown" and "beaver" ultimately stem from the same root word.

=== Beige ===
Beige
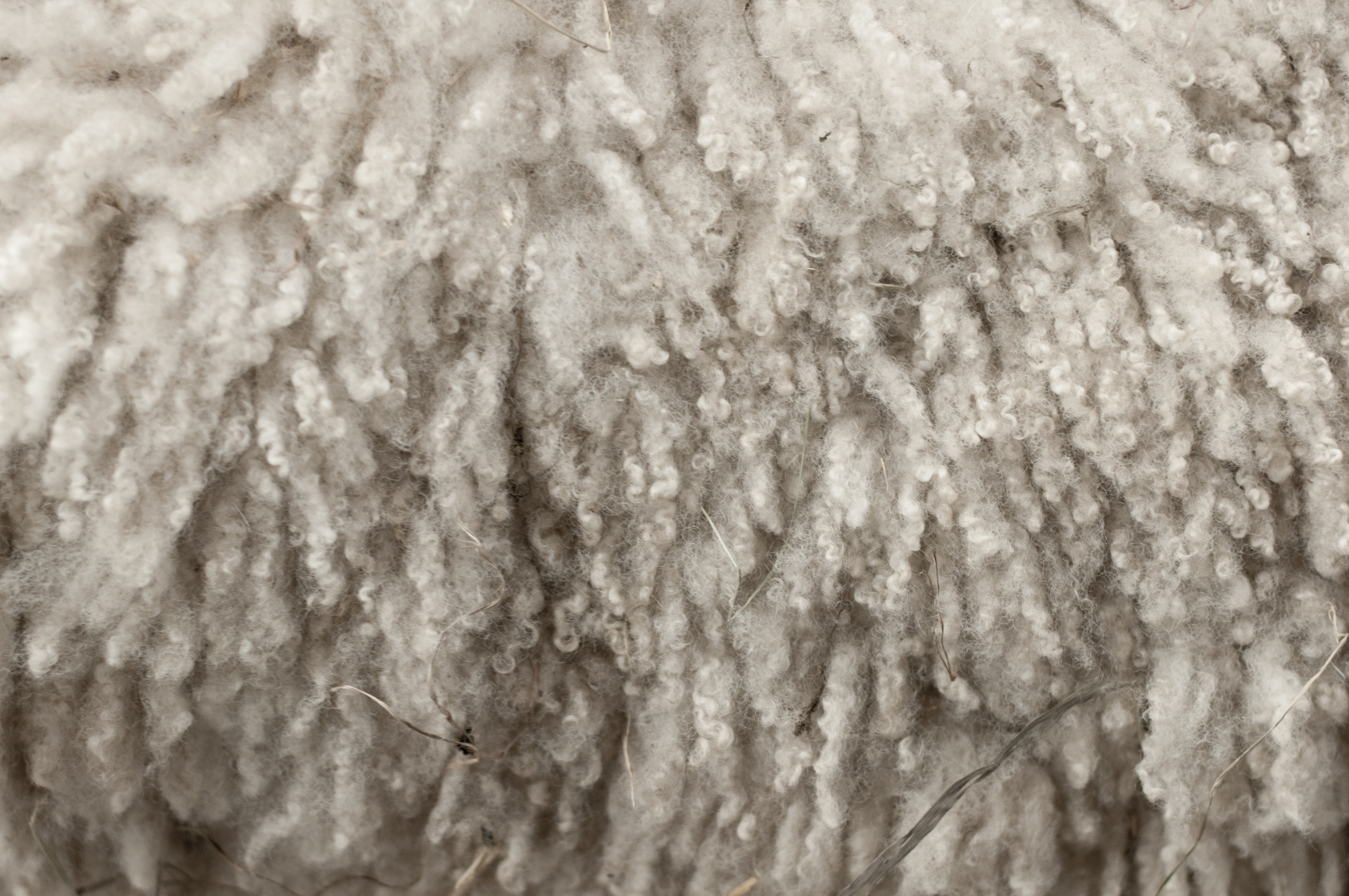
- Wool just before processing

Color coordinates
- Hex triplet: #F5F5DC
- sRGB^{B} (r, g, b): (245, 245, 220)
- HSV (h, s, v): (60°, 10%, 96%)
- CIELCh_{uv} (L, C, h): (96, 19, 86°)
- Source: X11
- ISCC–NBS descriptor: Pale yellow green
- B: Normalized to [0–255] (byte)

Beige is a pale sandy brown color representative of the color of unbleached wool. At a hue of 60, it is classified as a yellow-brown.

=== Bistre (Bister) ===
Bistre (Bister)

Color coordinates
- Hex triplet: #3D2B1F
- sRGB^{B} (r, g, b): (61, 43, 31)
- HSV (h, s, v): (24°, 49%, 24%)
- CIELCh_{uv} (L, C, h): (19, 14, 39°)
- Source: 99colors.net
- ISCC–NBS descriptor: Dark yellowish brown
- B: Normalized to [0–255] (byte)

Bistre or Bister is an dark grayish shade of brown derived from the pigment of the same name.

Bistre is a pigment that is made from soot, hence why it can also be called soot brown. The traditional method for making the pigment is to burn wood (usually beechwood to make the soot, then boiling it and diluting it with water.

=== Buff ===
Buff
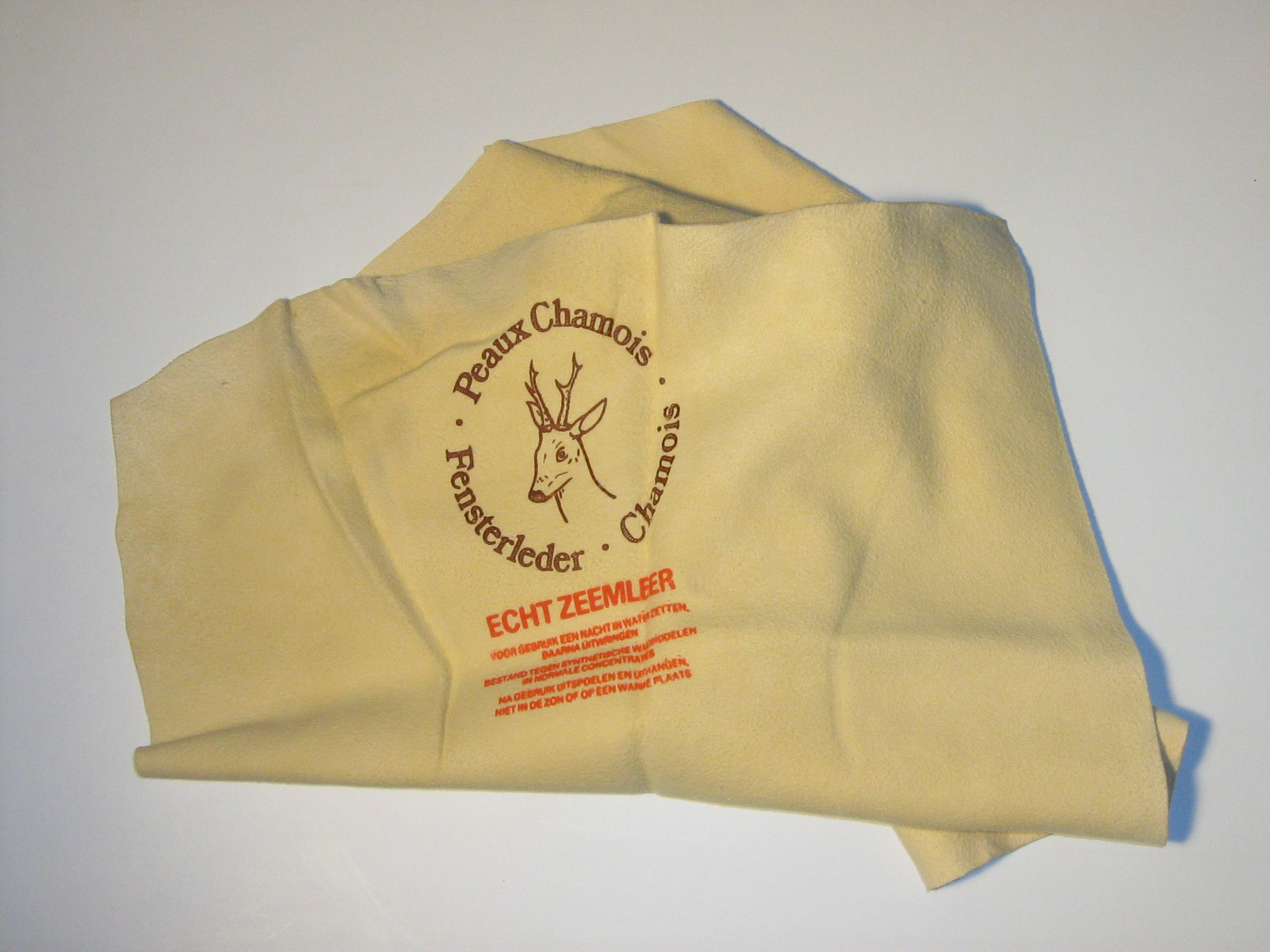
- Buff is the color of fine undyed leathers.

Color coordinates
- Hex triplet: #DAA06D
- sRGB^{B} (r, g, b): (218, 160, 109)
- HSV (h, s, v): (28°, 50%, 85%)
- CIELCh_{uv} (L, C, h): (70, 60, 43°)
- Source: Maerz and Paul
- ISCC–NBS descriptor: Light yellow
- B: Normalized to [0–255] (byte)

Buff is a pale yellow-brown color that got its name from the color of buffed leather. At a hue of 28, it is classified as an orange-brown.

According to the Oxford English Dictionary, buff as a descriptor of a color was first used in the London Gazette of 1686, describing a uniform to be "A Red Coat with a Buff-colour'd lining".

=== Burnt umber ===
Burnt umber
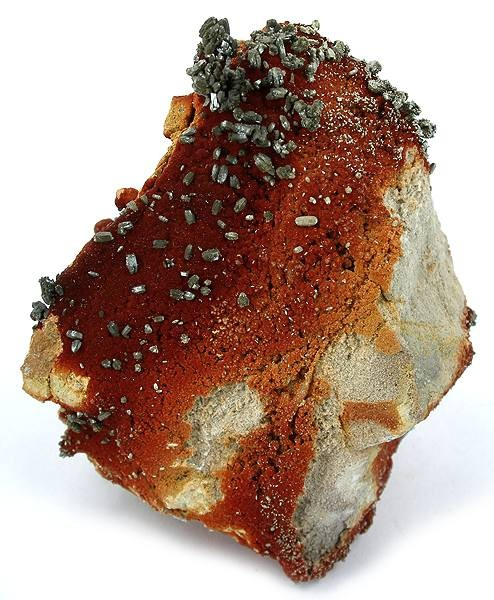
- Vanadinite crystals showing burnt umber coloration

Color coordinates
- Hex triplet: #8A3324
- sRGB^{B} (r, g, b): (138, 51, 36)
- HSV (h, s, v): (9°, 74%, 54%)
- CIELCh_{uv} (L, C, h): (34, 69, 17°)
- Source: Xona.com Color List
- ISCC–NBS descriptor: Strong reddish brown
- B: Normalized to [0–255] (byte)

Burnt umber is made by heating raw umber, which dehydrates the iron oxides and changes them partially to the more reddish hematite. It is used for both oil and water color paint. At a hue of 9, it is classified as a red-brown.

The first recorded use of burnt umber as a color name in English was in 1650.

=== Chestnut ===
Chestnut
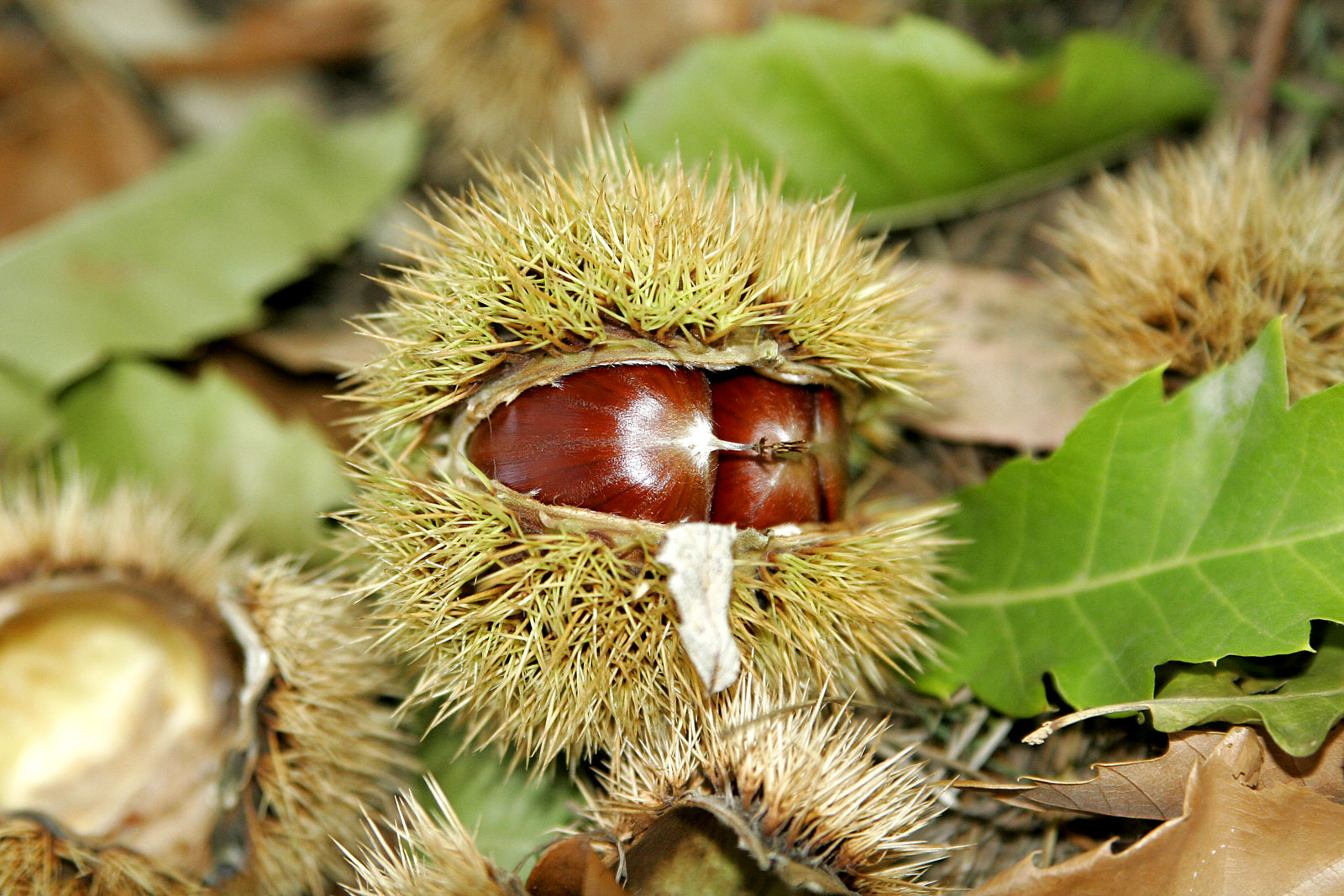
- Chestnuts can be found on the ground around chestnut trees.

Color coordinates
- Hex triplet: #954535
- sRGB^{B} (r, g, b): (149, 69, 53)
- HSV (h, s, v): (10°, 64%, 58%)
- CIELCh_{uv} (L, C, h): (39, 63, 19°)
- Source: Maerz and Paul
- ISCC–NBS descriptor: Strong reddish brown
- B: Normalized to [0–255] (byte)

Displayed at right is the color chestnut. At a hue of 10, it is classified as a red-brown.

=== Chocolate ===
Chocolate
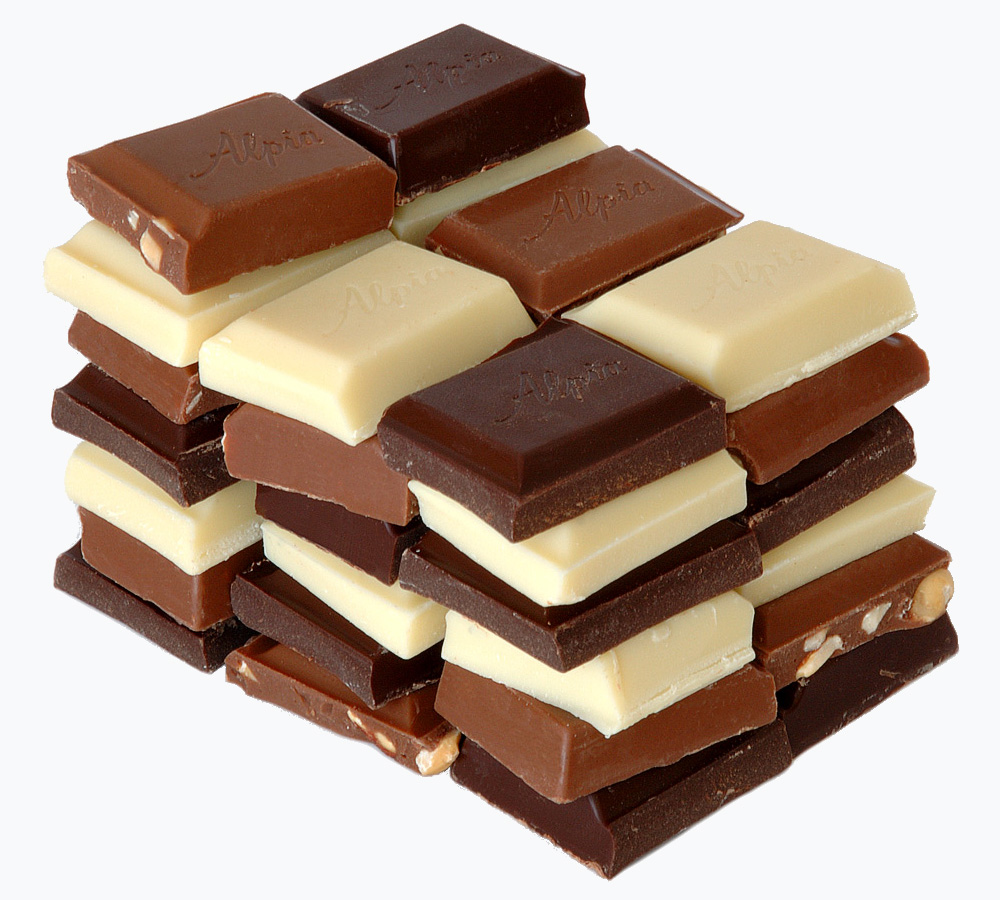
- Chocolate most commonly comes in three shades; dark, milk, and white varieties, with cocoa solids contributing to the brown coloration.

Color coordinates
- Hex triplet: #7B3F00
- sRGB^{B} (r, g, b): (123, 63, 0)
- HSV (h, s, v): (31°, 100%, 48%)
- CIELCh_{uv} (L, C, h): (33, 57, 33°)
- Source: Maerz and Paul
- ISCC–NBS descriptor: Strong brown
- B: Normalized to [0–255] (byte)

The color chocolate has a hue of 31, and is classified as an orange-brown.

=== Cigar brown ===
Cigar Brown
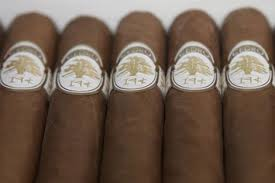
- Cigars

Color coordinates
- Hex triplet: #6D4F4B
- sRGB^{B} (r, g, b): (109, 79, 75)
- HSV (h, s, v): (7°, 31%, 43%)
- CIELCh_{uv} (L, C, h): (37, 20, 20°)
- Source: My Perfect Color
- B: Normalized to [0–255] (byte)

Cigar brown is a brown shade resembling the color of cigars.

=== Cocoa brown ===
Cocoa Brown
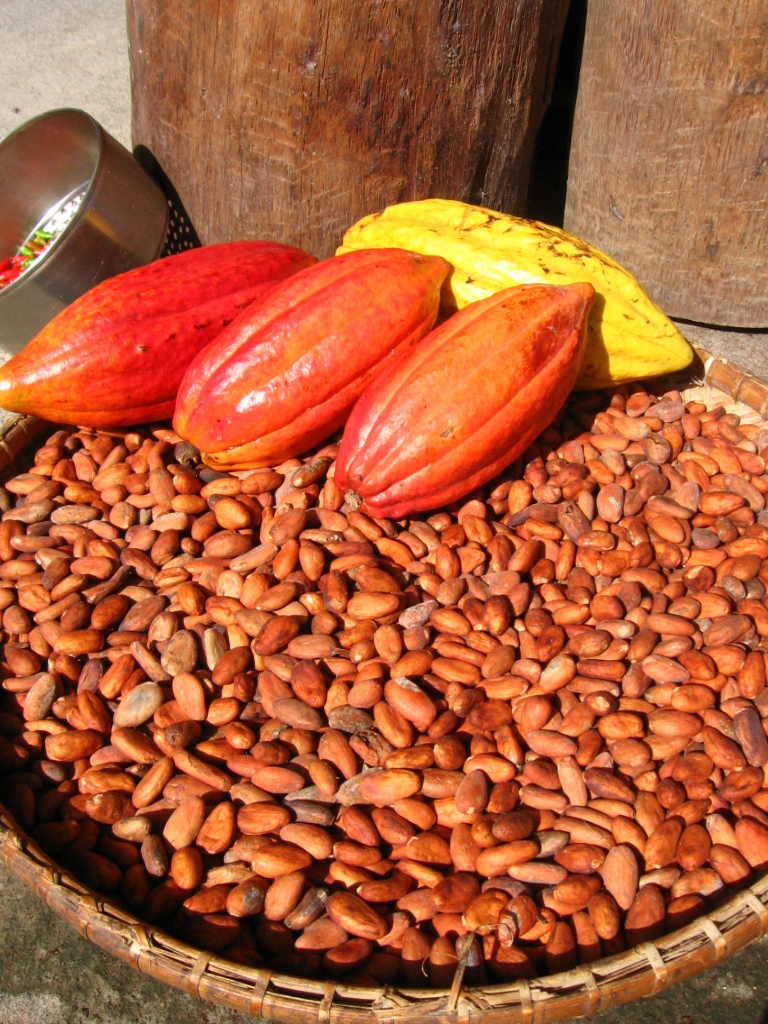
- Chocolate is created from the cocoa bean. A cacao tree with cocoa bean fruit pods (which are filled with cocoa beans inside of them) in various stages of ripening

Color coordinates
- Hex triplet: #D2691E
- sRGB^{B} (r, g, b): (210, 105, 30)
- HSV (h, s, v): (25°, 86%, 82%)
- CIELCh_{uv} (L, C, h): (56, 99, 29°)
- Source: X11
- ISCC–NBS descriptor: Deep orange
- B: Normalized to [0–255] (byte)

Displayed at right is the color cocoa brown. At a hue of 25, it is classified as an orange-brown.

=== Dark brown ===
Dark Brown

Color coordinates
- Hex triplet: #5C4033
- sRGB^{B} (r, g, b): (92, 64, 51)
- HSV (h, s, v): (19°, 45%, 36%)
- CIELCh_{uv} (L, C, h): (30, 22, 33°)
- Source: X11
- B: Normalized to [0–255] (byte)

Dark brown is a dark tone of color brown. At a hue of 19, it is classified as a black-brown. An archaic term for it is piceous.

=== Desert sand ===
Desert Sand
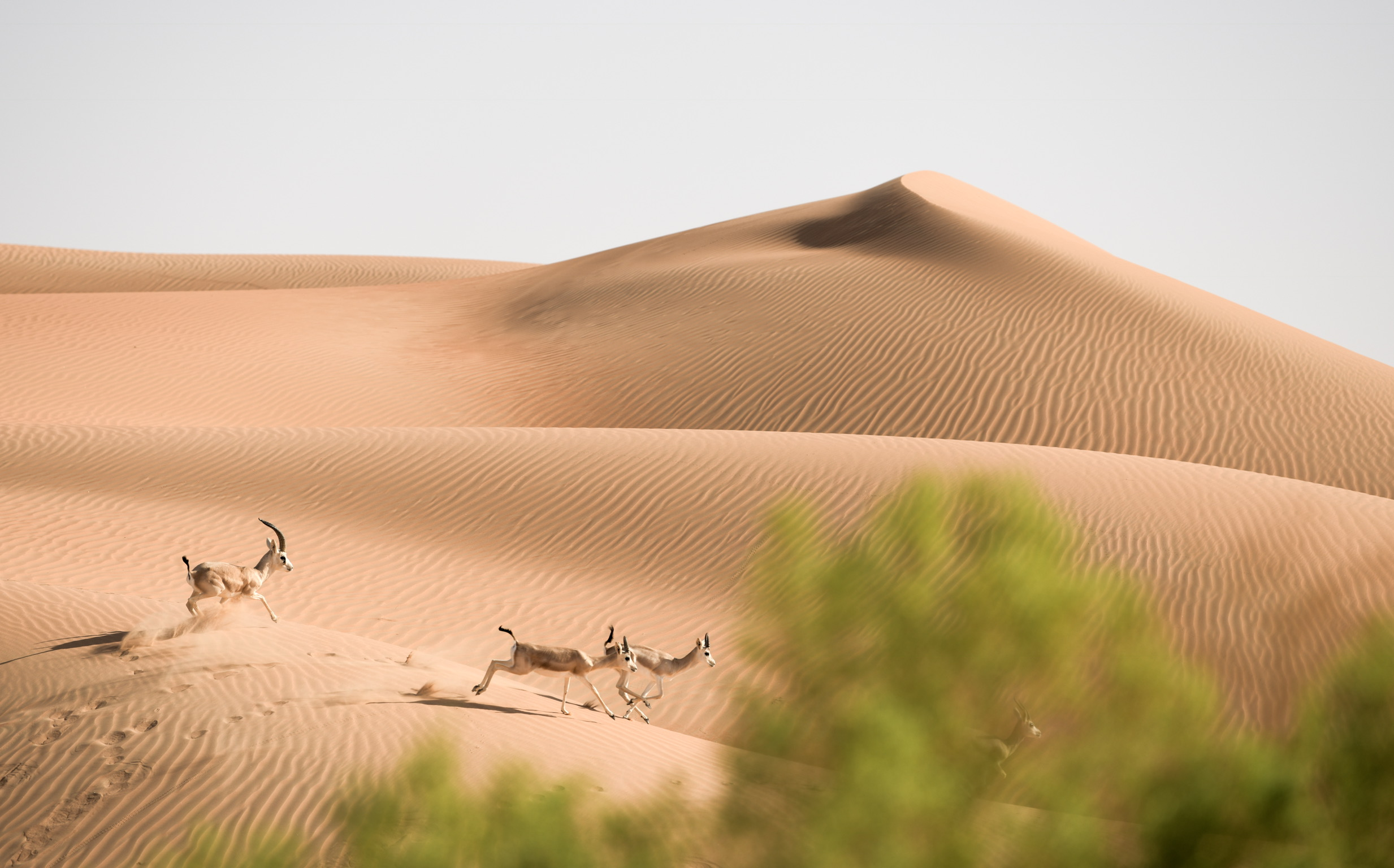
- Desert landscape in the United Arab Emirates

Color coordinates
- Hex triplet: #EDC9AF
- sRGB^{B} (r, g, b): (237, 201, 175)
- HSV (h, s, v): (25°, 26%, 93%)
- CIELCh_{uv} (L, C, h): (83, 34, 44°)
- Source: Crayola
- ISCC–NBS descriptor: Pale orange yellow
- B: Normalized to [0–255] (byte)

The color desert sand is displayed at right. At a hue of 19, it is classified as an orange-brown.

It may be publicly regarded as a deep shade of beige. It is a pale tint of a color called desert.

The color name "desert" was first used in 1920.

=== Khaki ===
Khaki
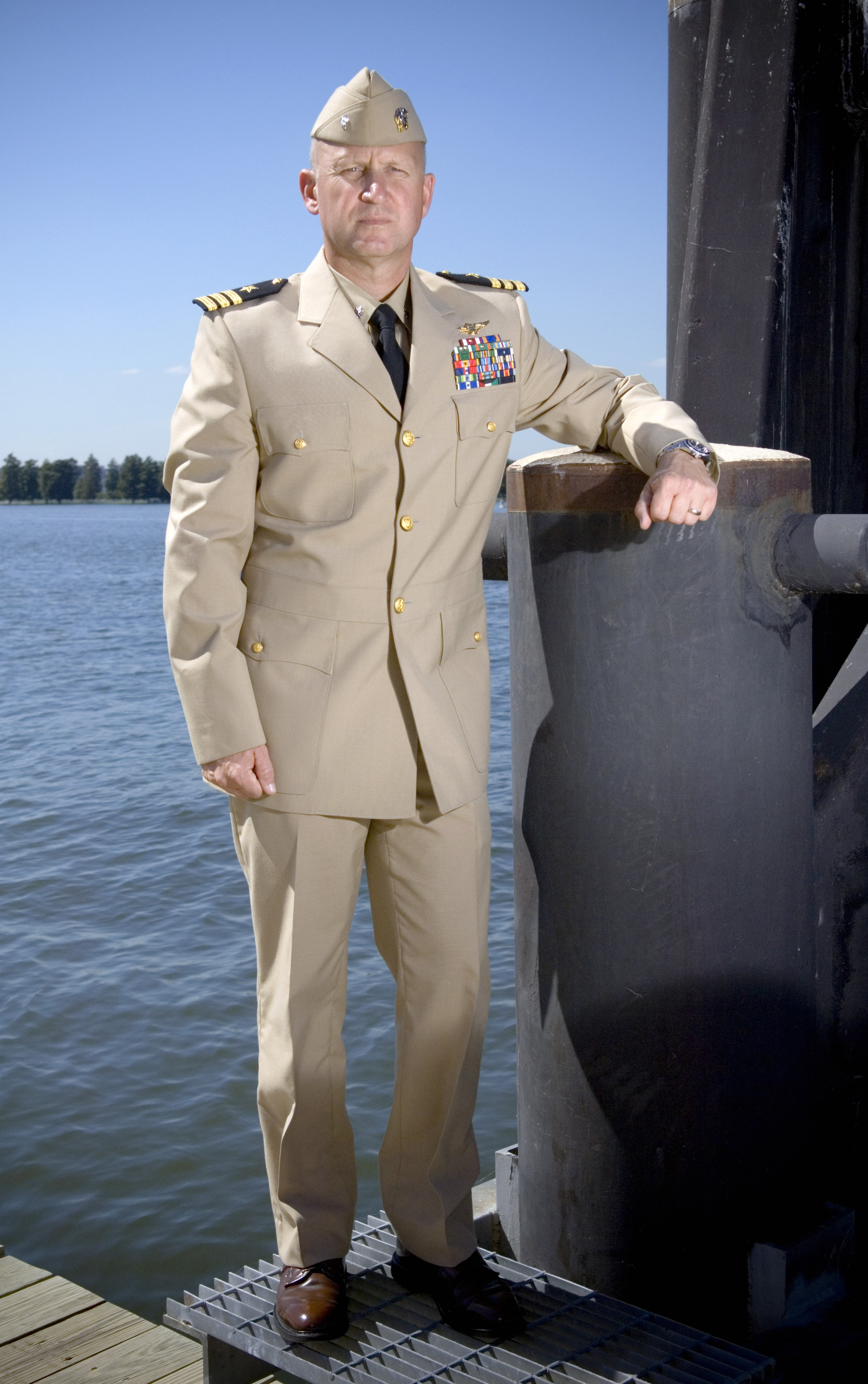
- Khaki uniform

Color coordinates
- Hex triplet: #C3B091
- sRGB^{B} (r, g, b): (195, 176, 145)
- HSV (h, s, v): (37°, 26%, 76%)
- CIELCh_{uv} (L, C, h): (73, 28, 61°)
- Source: HTML/CSS
- ISCC–NBS descriptor: Grayish yellow
- B: Normalized to [0–255] (byte)

The web color khaki has a hue of 37, and is classified as an orange-brown. This example matches the color designated as khaki in the 1930 book A Dictionary of Color, the standard for color nomenclature before the introduction of computers.

The first recorded use of khaki as a color name in English was in 1848.

=== Kobicha (Brown-nose) ===
Kobicha

Color coordinates
- Hex triplet: #6B4423
- sRGB^{B} (r, g, b): (107, 68, 35)
- HSV (h, s, v): (28°, 67%, 42%)
- CIELCh_{uv} (L, C, h): (33, 37, 39°)
- Source: JTC
- ISCC–NBS descriptor: Strong brown
- B: Normalized to [0–255] (byte)

The color kobicha (brown-nose) is displayed at right. At a hue of 28, it is classified as an orange-brown.

It is one of the Japanese traditional colors that has been in use since 660 AD in the form of various dyes used in designing kimono.

The name kobicha comes from the Japanese for the color of a type of kelp tea, but the word was often used as a synonym for a form of flattery in a curious parallel with the English usage brown nosing.

=== Manhattan ===
Manhattan

Color coordinates
- Hex triplet: #F8C898
- sRGB^{B} (r, g, b): (248, 200, 152)
- HSV (h, s, v): (30°, 39%, 97%)
- CIELCh_{uv} (L, C, h): (84, 52, 49°)
- Source: hexcolor.co
- ISCC–NBS descriptor: Pale light grayish brown
- B: Normalized to [0–255] (byte)

Manhattan is a pale light grayish brown color.

=== Maroon ===
Maroon

Color coordinates
- Hex triplet: #800000
- sRGB^{B} (r, g, b): (128, 0, 0)
- HSV (h, s, v): (0°, 100%, 50%)
- CIELCh_{uv} (L, C, h): (26, 86, 12°)
- Source: HTML/CSS
- ISCC–NBS descriptor: Deep reddish brown
- B: Normalized to [0–255] (byte)

Displayed at right is the web color called maroon in HTML/CSS and it is a brownish crimson color that takes its name from the French word marron, or chestnut. "Marron" is also one of the French translations for "brown".

=== Milk chocolate ===
Milk Chocolate
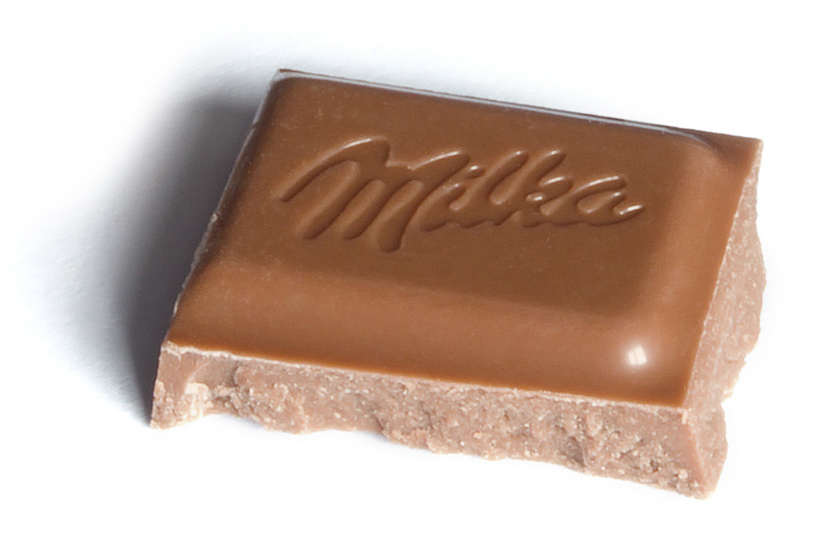
- A chunk of Milka

Color coordinates
- Hex triplet: #84563C
- sRGB^{B} (r, g, b): (132, 86, 60)
- HSV (h, s, v): (22°, 55%, 52%)
- CIELCh_{uv} (L, C, h): (41, 40, 34°)
- Source: Color Register
- B: Normalized to [0–255] (byte)

Milk chocolate is a moderate shade of brown representing the color of milk chocolate.

=== Ochre (Ocher) ===
Ochre (Ocher)

Color coordinates
- Hex triplet: #CC7722
- sRGB^{B} (r, g, b): (204, 119, 34)
- HSV (h, s, v): (30°, 83%, 80%)
- CIELCh_{uv} (L, C, h): (58, 87, 37°)
- Source: colorxs.com/color
- ISCC–NBS descriptor: Deep orange
- B: Normalized to [0–255] (byte)

Ochre or Ocher is an orangeish shade of brown derived from the clay earth pigment of the same name that ranges in color from yellow to deep orange or brown.

Ochre is also any clay that is colored with iron oxide derived during the extraction of tin and copper.

=== Peru ===
Peru

Color coordinates
- Hex triplet: #CD853F
- sRGB^{B} (r, g, b): (205, 133, 63)
- HSV (h, s, v): (30°, 69%, 80%)
- CIELCh_{uv} (L, C, h): (62, 75, 40°)
- Source: X11
- ISCC–NBS descriptor: Moderate orange
- B: Normalized to [0–255] (byte)

The web color Peru has a hue of 30, and is classified as an orange-brown.

This color was originally called Peruvian brown with the first recorded use in 1924 of Peruvian brown as a color name in English.

The color name was changed to peru in 1987, when this color was formulated as one of the X11 colors, which in the early 1990s became known as the X11 web colors.

=== Raw umber ===
Raw Umber
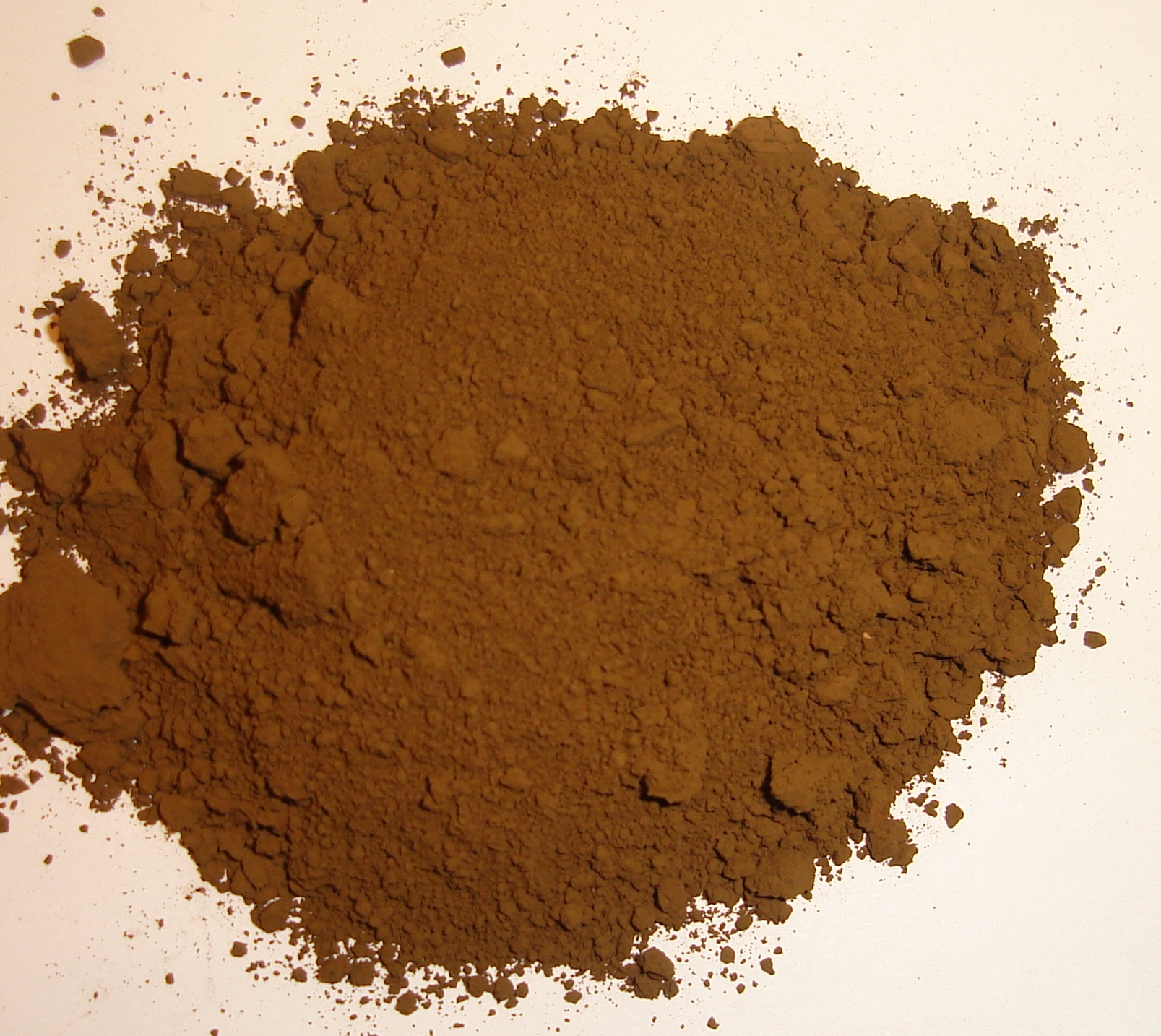
- Raw umber pigment

Color coordinates
- Hex triplet: #826644
- sRGB^{B} (r, g, b): (130, 102, 68)
- HSV (h, s, v): (33°, 48%, 51%)
- CIELCh_{uv} (L, C, h): (45, 33, 52°)
- Source: ISCC-NBS
- ISCC–NBS descriptor: Moderate yellowish brown
- B: Normalized to [0–255] (byte)

This version of the color raw umber has a hue of 33, and is classified as an orange-brown.

=== Rosy brown ===
Rosy Brown

Color coordinates
- Hex triplet: #BC8F8F
- sRGB^{B} (r, g, b): (188, 143, 143)
- HSV (h, s, v): (0°, 24%, 74%)
- CIELCh_{uv} (L, C, h): (64, 29, 12°)
- Source: X11
- ISCC–NBS descriptor: Light grayish red
- B: Normalized to [0–255] (byte)

Displayed here is the web color rosy brown. At a hue of 359, it is classified as a red-brown.

The color name rosy brown first came into use in 1987, when this color was formulated as one of the X11 colors, which in the early 1990s became known as the X11 web colors.

=== Russet ===
Russet

Color coordinates
- Hex triplet: #80461B
- sRGB^{B} (r, g, b): (128, 70, 27)
- HSV (h, s, v): (26°, 79%, 50%)
- CIELCh_{uv} (L, C, h): (36, 54, 33°)
- Source: ISCC-NBS
- ISCC–NBS descriptor: Strong brown
- B: Normalized to [0–255] (byte)

Russet is a dark brown color with a reddish-orange tinge. At a hue of 26, it is classified as an orange-brown.

The first recorded use of russet as a color name in English was in 1562.

The name of the color derives from russet, a coarse cloth made of wool and dyed with woad and madder to give it a subdued gray or reddish-brown shade. By the statute of 1363, poor English people were required to wear russet.

Russet, a color of fall, is often associated with sorrow or grave seriousness. Anticipating a lifetime of regret, Shakespeare's character Biron says: "Henceforth my wooing mind shall be express'd / In russet yeas and honest kersey noes." (Love's Labour's Lost, Act V, Scene 1)

=== Sable ===
Sable

Color coordinates
- Hex triplet: #6E403C
- sRGB^{B} (r, g, b): (110, 64, 60)
- HSV (h, s, v): (5°, 45%, 43%)
- CIELCh_{uv} (L, C, h): (32, 32, 16°)
- ISCC–NBS descriptor: Strong reddish brown
- B: Normalized to [0–255] (byte)

Sable is a shade of brown representative of the color of a sable. The color sable is best described as a copper-blonde metallic brown.

=== Saddle Brown ===
Saddle Brown
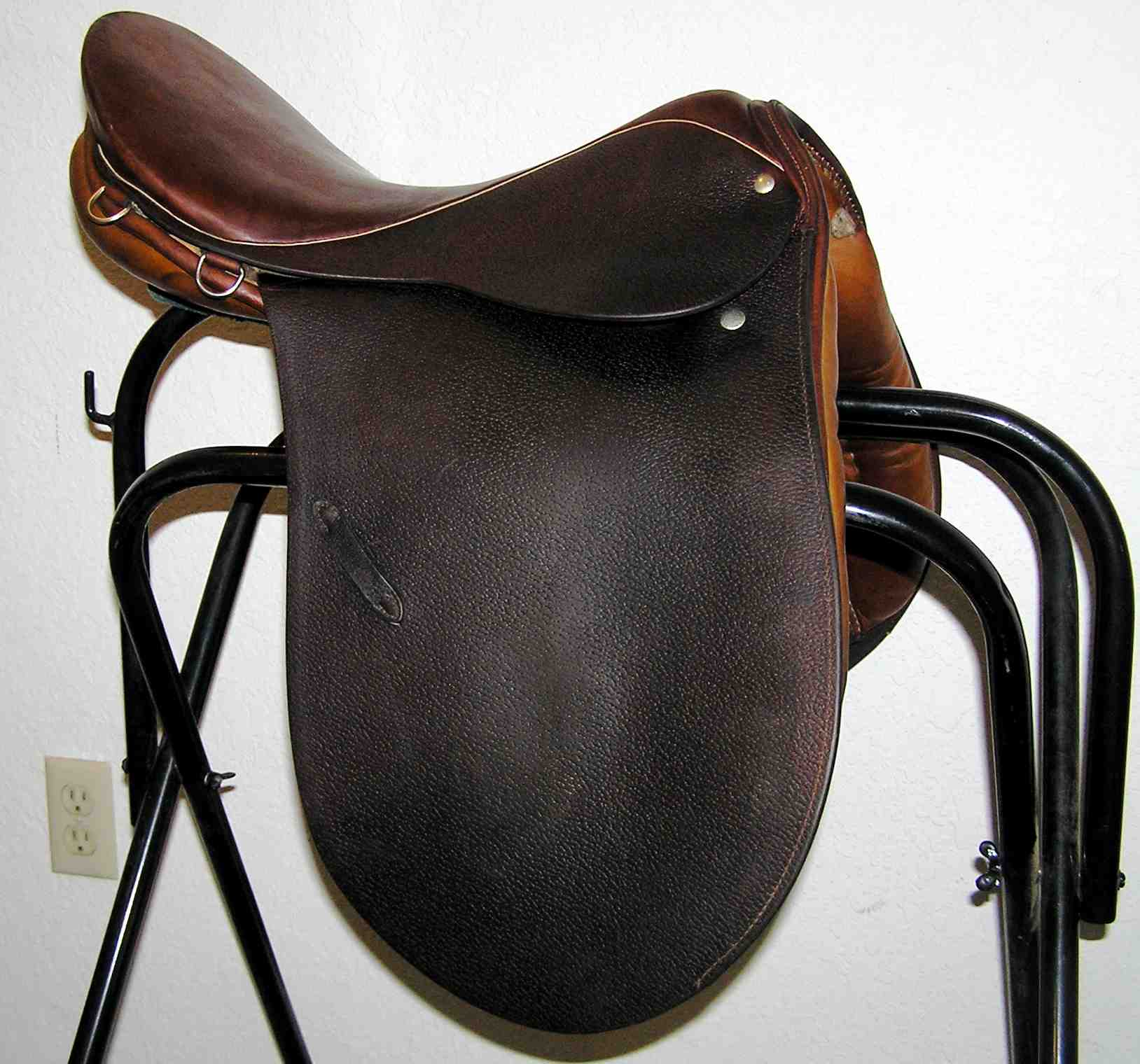

Color coordinates
- Hex triplet: #8B4513
- sRGB^{B} (r, g, b): (139, 69, 19)
- HSV (h, s, v): (25°, 86%, 55%)
- CIELCh_{uv} (L, C, h): (37, 64, 30°)
- Source: X11
- B: Normalized to [0–255] (byte)

An X11 color, Saddle Brown is a mid brown common for the stained leather of a saddle.

=== Sandy brown ===
Sandy Brown
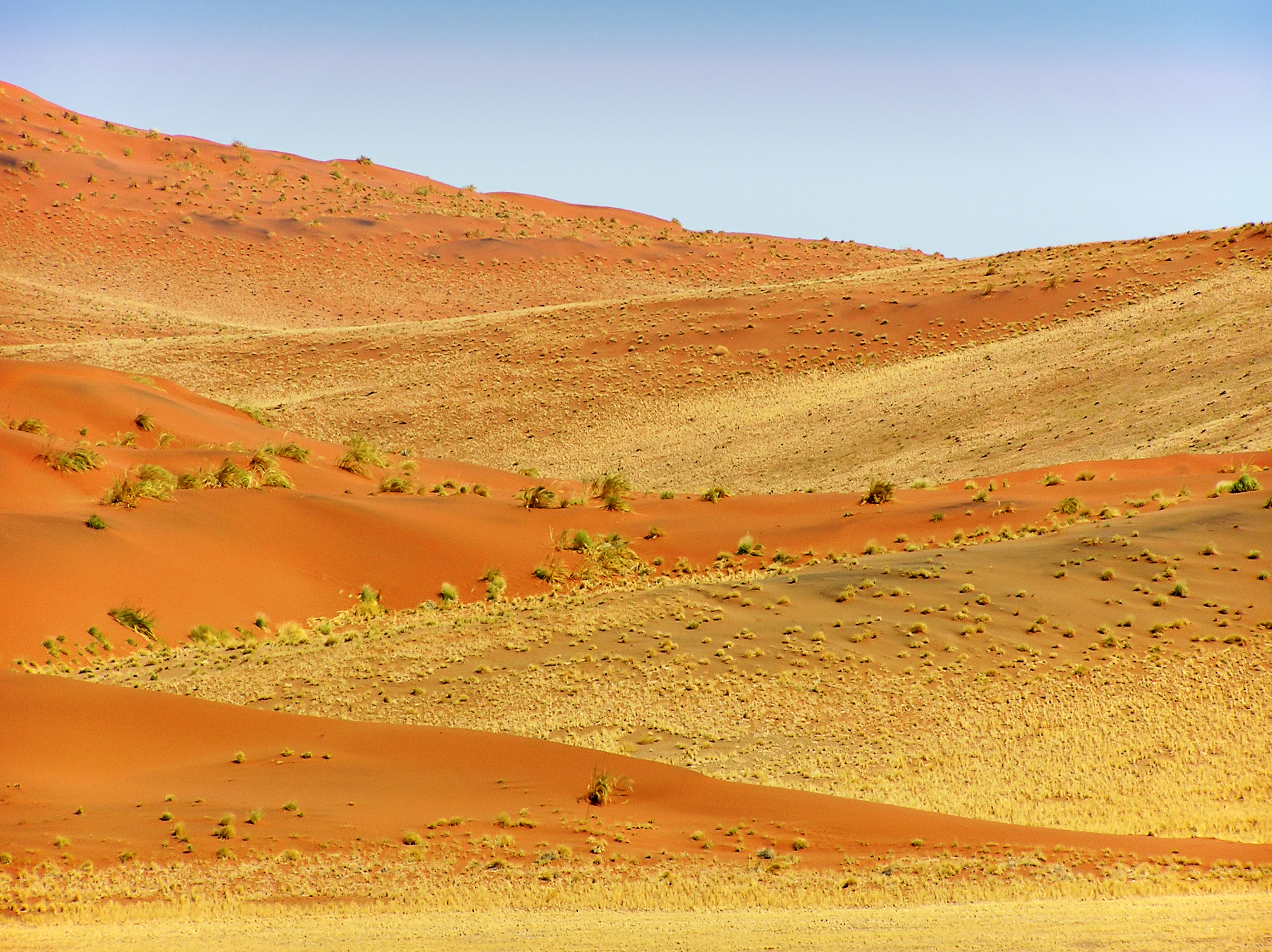
- Sand dunes in Namibia

Color coordinates
- Hex triplet: #F4A460
- sRGB^{B} (r, g, b): (244, 164, 96)
- HSV (h, s, v): (28°, 61%, 96%)
- CIELCh_{uv} (L, C, h): (74, 81, 40°)
- Source: X11
- ISCC–NBS descriptor: Moderate orange
- B: Normalized to [0–255] (byte)

Sandy brown is a pale shade of brown. Sandy brown is one of the web colors. At a hue of 28, it is classified as an orange-brown.

As its name suggests, it is a shade of brown which is similar to the color of some sands.

The color name sandy brown first came into use in 1987, when this color was formulated as one of the X11 colors, which in the early 1990s became known as the X11 web colors.

=== Sepia ===
Sepia

Color coordinates
- Hex triplet: #704214
- sRGB^{B} (r, g, b): (112, 66, 20)
- HSV (h, s, v): (30°, 82%, 44%)
- CIELCh_{uv} (L, C, h): (33, 45, 38°)
- Source: Maerz and Paul
- B: Normalized to [0–255] (byte)

Sepia is a reddish-brown color, named after the rich brown pigment derived from the ink sac of the common cuttlefish Sepia.

=== Smokey topaz ===
Smokey Topaz
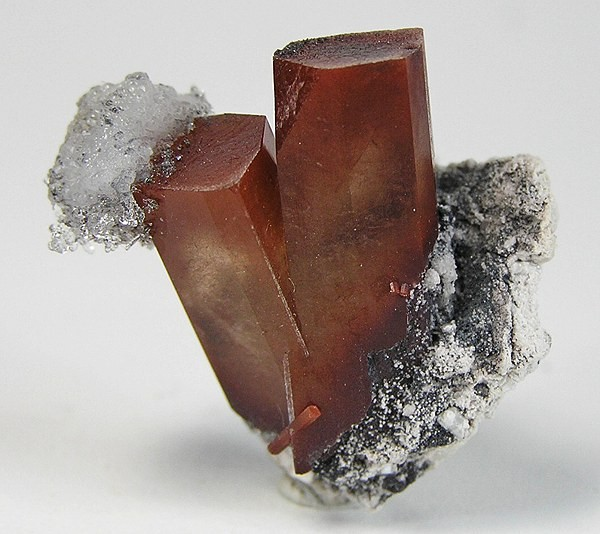
- Smoky topaz crystals

Color coordinates
- Hex triplet: #832A0D
- sRGB^{B} (r, g, b): (131, 42, 13)
- HSV (h, s, v): (15°, 90%, 51%)
- CIELCh_{uv} (L, C, h): (31, 72, 19°)
- Source: Crayola
- ISCC–NBS descriptor: Strong reddish brown
- B: Normalized to [0–255] (byte)

Displayed at right is the color smokey topaz. At a hue of exactly 15, it is classified as a red-brown or orange-brown. It can also be called a vermilion-brown.

This color was formulated by Crayola in 1994 as one of the colors in the Gem Tones set.

=== Tan ===
Tan

Color coordinates
- Hex triplet: #D2B48C
- sRGB^{B} (r, g, b): (210, 180, 140)
- HSV (h, s, v): (34°, 33%, 82%)
- CIELCh_{uv} (L, C, h): (75, 39, 56°)
- Source: X11
- ISCC–NBS descriptor: Grayish yellow
- B: Normalized to [0–255] (byte)

Tan is a pale tone of brown. At a hue of 34, it is classified as an orange-brown.

The name is derived from tannum (oak bark) used in the tanning of leather.

The first recorded use of tan as a color name in English was in the year 1590.

=== Taupe ===
Taupe
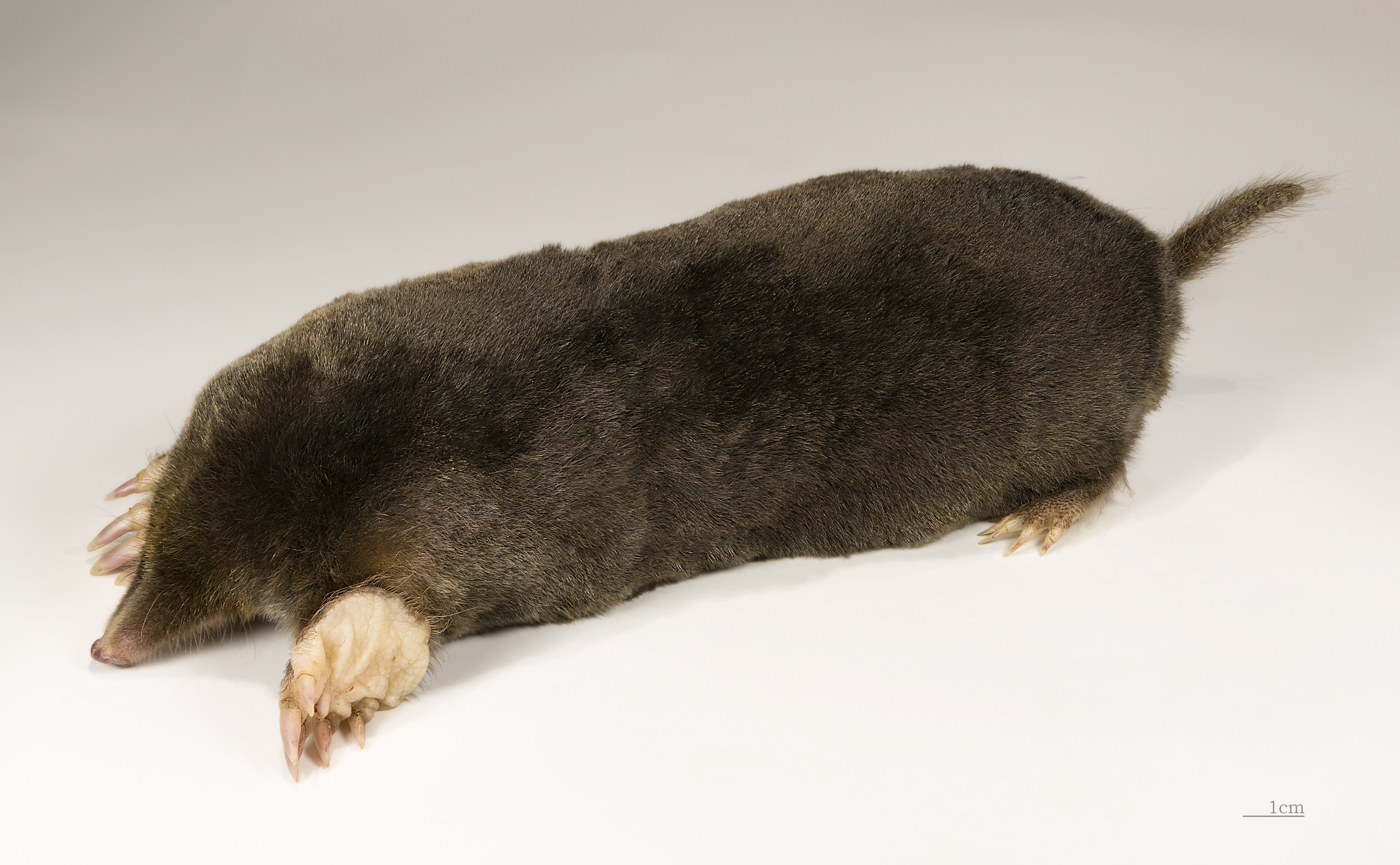
- A European mole. Taupe is French for mole.

Color coordinates
- Hex triplet: #483C32
- sRGB^{B} (r, g, b): (72, 60, 50)
- HSV (h, s, v): (27°, 31%, 28%)
- CIELCh_{uv} (L, C, h): (26, 11, 47°)
- Source: ISCC-NBS
- ISCC–NBS descriptor: Dark grayish yellowish brown
- B: Normalized to [0–255] (byte)

The color taupe is a representation of the average color of the fur of the French mole. At a hue of 30, it is classified as an orange-brown.

The color displayed at right matches the color sample called taupe referenced below in the 1930 book A Dictionary of Color.

The first use of "taupe" as a color name in English was in the early 19th century (exact year is not known).

=== Walnut brown ===
Walnut Brown
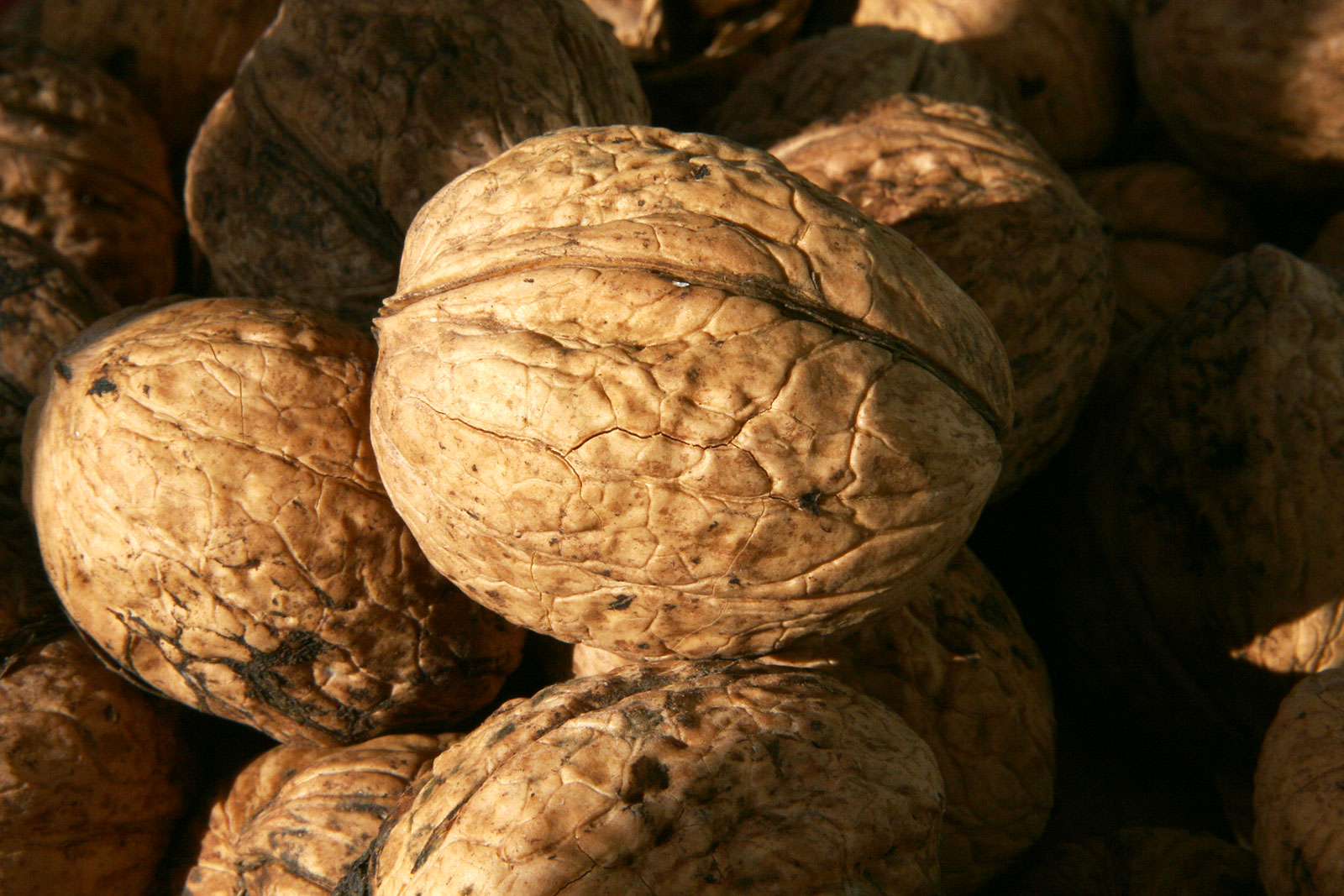
- A bunch of walnuts

Color coordinates
- Hex triplet: #5C5248
- sRGB^{B} (r, g, b): (92, 82, 72)
- HSV (h, s, v): (30°, 22%, 36%)
- CIELCh_{uv} (L, C, h): (36, 11, 52°)
- Source: Color Register
- ISCC–NBS descriptor: Moderate olive brown
- B: Normalized to [0–255] (byte)

Walnut brown is a dark brown color; a representation of the color of walnut hulls. At a hue of 30, it is classified as an orange-brown.

=== Wenge ===
Wenge
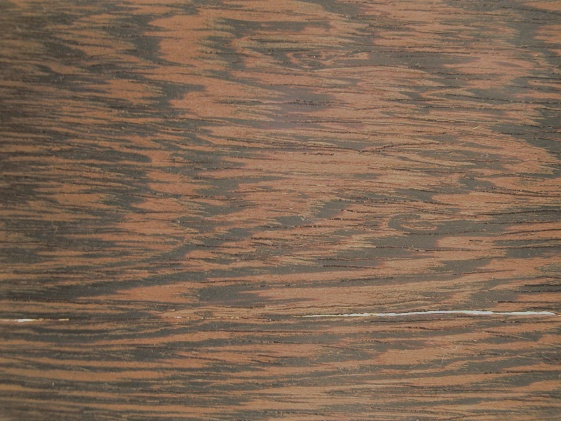
- Wenge wood

Color coordinates
- Hex triplet: #645452
- sRGB^{B} (r, g, b): (100, 84, 82)
- HSV (h, s, v): (7°, 18%, 39%)
- CIELCh_{uv} (L, C, h): (37, 10, 20°)
- Source: ColorHexa
- B: Normalized to [0–255] (byte)

Wenge refers to the distinctive color of the dark-colored wood that is the product of Millettia laurentii, a legume tree from Africa. At a hue of 9, it is classified as a red-brown.

=== Wood brown ===
Wood Brown
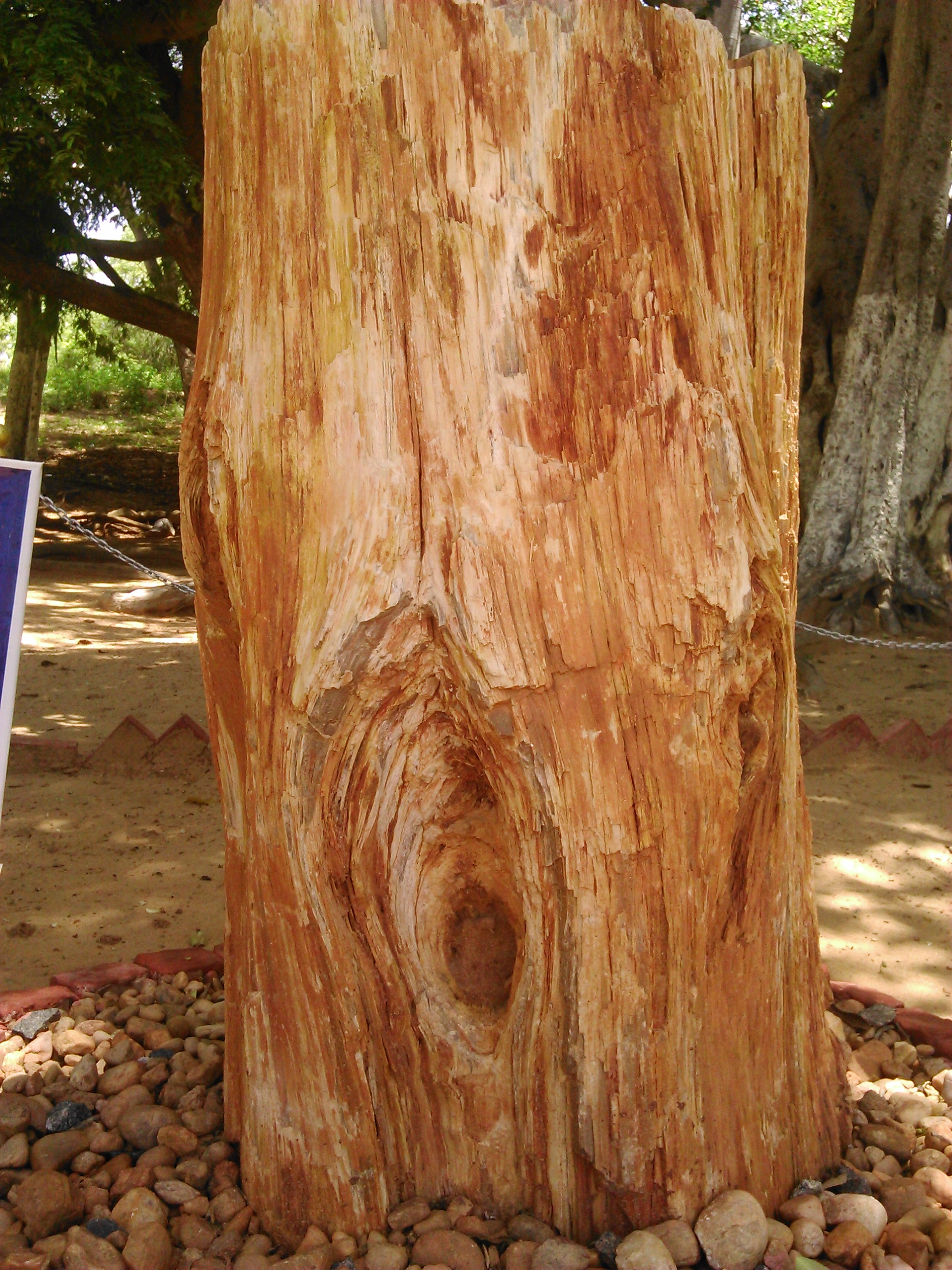
- A wooden tree stump

Color coordinates
- Hex triplet: #C19A6B
- sRGB^{B} (r, g, b): (193, 154, 107)
- HSV (h, s, v): (33°, 45%, 76%)
- CIELCh_{uv} (L, C, h): (66, 47, 52°)
- Source: Ridgway
- ISCC–NBS descriptor: Light yellowish brown
- B: Normalized to [0–255] (byte)

Wood brown is a color that resembles wood.

The first recorded use of wood brown as a color name in English was in Robert Ridgway's 1886 book Nomenclature of Colors for Naturalists, Compendium of Useful Knowledge for Ornithologists. Ridgway further refined the details of its color coordinates in his 1912 publication Color Standards and Color Nomenclature.

The normalized color coordinates for wood brown are identical to fallow, camel and desert, which were first recorded as color names in English in 1000, 1916, and 1920, respectively.

=== Xumo ===
Xumo

Color coordinates
- Hex triplet: #413639
- sRGB^{B} (r, g, b): (65, 54, 57)
- HSV (h, s, v): (344°, 17%, 25%)
- CIELCh_{uv} (L, C, h): (24, 6, 352°)
- Source: The Official Register of Color Names
- ISCC–NBS descriptor: Dark grayish purple
- B: Normalized to [0–255] (byte)

Xumo is a dark, muted reddish-brown color with a hint of gray.

== See also ==
- Pantone 448 C
- Lists of colors
