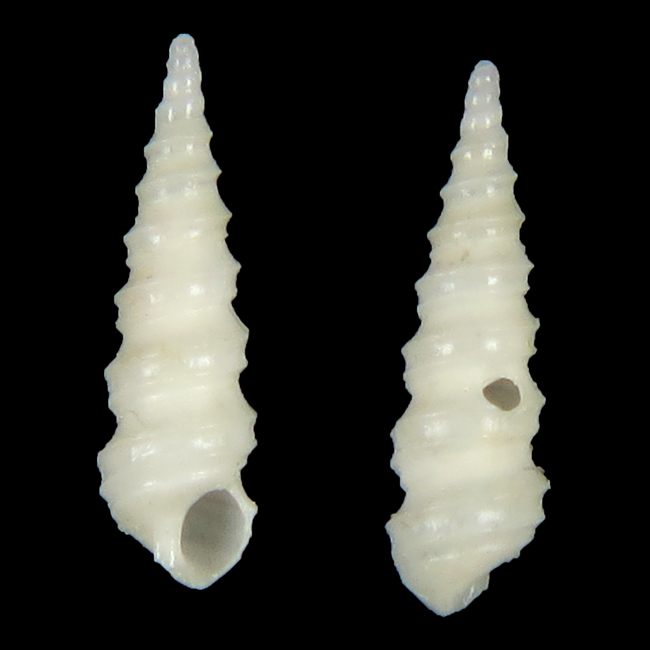

Scientific classification
- Kingdom: Animalia
- Phylum: Mollusca
- Class: Gastropoda
- Subclass: Caenogastropoda
- Order: Littorinimorpha
- Family: Eulimidae
- Genus: Cyclonidea
- Species: C. dondani

Binomial name
- Cyclonidea dondani Poppe & Tagaro, 2016

= Cyclonidea dondani =

Species of gastropod

Cyclonidea dondani is a species of sea snail, a marine gastropod mollusk in the family Eulimidae.

== Description ==
The shell of C. dondani is an extended and slim spire, its conical shape narrowing to a pointed apex. The coils of the shell have fine spiral rims on the shell exterior, which give it a slightly toothed impression. The shell color is white or cream-colored, sometimes with brownish spots or markings. It attains a length of 2.5 mm.

As a member of the family Eulimidae, Cyclonidea dondani is likely a parasitic species that feeds on the tissues of marine animals such as echinoderms. Some eulimids are known to live on the exterior of their hosts, while others burrow into the host's tissues.

== Distribution ==
This marine species occurs off the Philippines.

== Original Description ==
- Poppe G.T. & Tagaro S. (2016). "New marine mollusks from the central Philippines in the families Aclididae, Chilodontidae, Cuspidariidae, Nuculanidae, Nystiellidae, Seraphsidae and Vanikoridae". Visaya. 4(5): 83–103. p. 86
