= Desert sand (color) =

Light reddish-yellow color

Desert Sand

Color coordinates
- Hex triplet: #EDC9AF
- sRGB^{B} (r, g, b): (237, 201, 175)
- HSV (h, s, v): (25°, 26%, 93%)
- CIELCh_{uv} (L, C, h): (83, 34, 44°)
- Source: Crayola
- ISCC–NBS descriptor: Pale orange yellow
- B: Normalized to [0–255] (byte)

Desert sand is a very light and very weakly saturated reddish yellow color which corresponds specifically to the coloration of sand. It may also be regarded as a deep tone of beige.

Desert sand was used by General Motors, along with "rosewood", as a paint color for their early Cadillacs.

In 1998, desert sand was made into a Crayola crayon color.

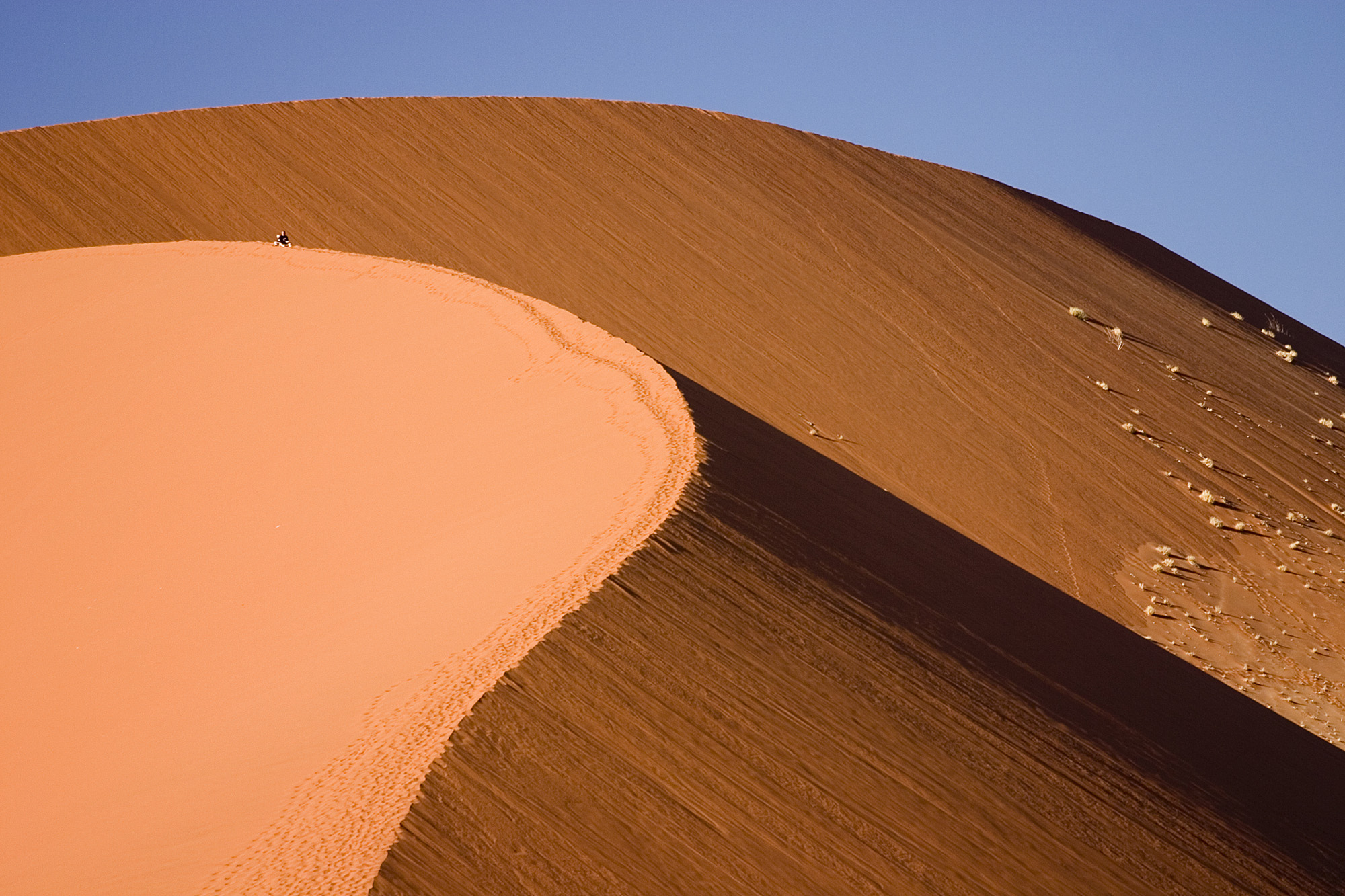
Namibian sand dune

The color shown matches the palest of the three colors in the 3-color Desert Camouflage Uniform of United States Armed Forces, which in 1990 began to replace the 6-color Desert Battle Dress Uniform.

== Variations ==
=== Sandy brown ===
Sandy Brown

Color coordinates
- Hex triplet: #F4A460
- sRGB^{B} (r, g, b): (244, 164, 96)
- HSV (h, s, v): (28°, 61%, 96%)
- CIELCh_{uv} (L, C, h): (74, 81, 40°)
- Source: X11
- ISCC–NBS descriptor: Moderate orange
- B: Normalized to [0–255] (byte)

Sandy brown is a shade of brown which is similar to the color of some sands.

=== Earth yellow ===
Earth Yellow

Color coordinates
- Hex triplet: #E1A95F
- sRGB^{B} (r, g, b): (225, 169, 95)
- HSV (h, s, v): (34°, 58%, 88%)
- CIELCh_{uv} (L, C, h): (73, 68, 51°)
- Source: xs4all.nl
- ISCC–NBS descriptor: Moderate orange yellow
- B: Normalized to [0–255] (byte)

Earth yellow is one of the twelve official camouflauge colors of the United States Army.

=== SAND ===
Sand

Color coordinates
- Hex triplet: #C2B280
- sRGB^{B} (r, g, b): (194, 178, 128)
- HSV (h, s, v): (45°, 34%, 76%)
- CIELCh_{uv} (L, C, h): (73, 39, 71°)
- Source: ISCC-NBS
- ISCC–NBS descriptor: Grayish yellow
- B: Normalized to [0–255] (byte)

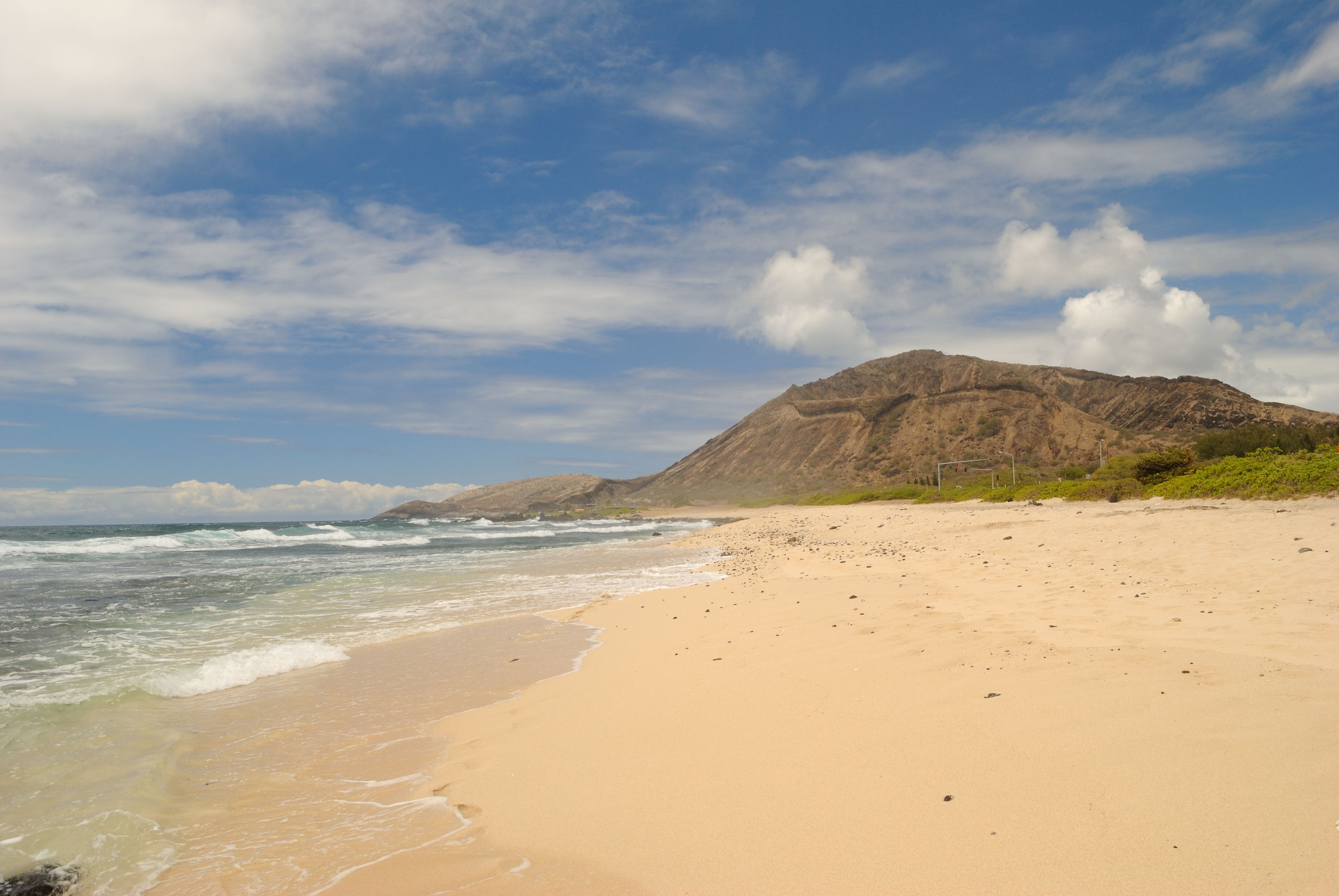
A sandy beach

Sand (also named beach) is a color that resembles that of beach sand. The first recorded use of sand as a color name in English was in 1627.

The normalized color coordinates for sand are identical to ecru, which was first recorded as a color name in English in 1836.

The San Diego Padres of Major League Baseball currently use Sand as one of their team colors.

=== Desert ===
Desert

Color coordinates
- Hex triplet: #C19A6B
- sRGB^{B} (r, g, b): (193, 154, 107)
- HSV (h, s, v): (33°, 45%, 76%)
- CIELCh_{uv} (L, C, h): (66, 47, 52°)
- Source: ISCC-NBS
- ISCC–NBS descriptor: Light yellowish brown
- B: Normalized to [0–255] (byte)

Desert is a color that resembles that of the flat areas of a desert. Its first recorded use as a color name in English was in 1920.

The normalized color coordinates for desert are identical to fallow, wood brown and camel, which were first recorded as color names in English in 1000, 1886, (Note: After recording "wood brown" in his 1886 book, Robert Ridgway further refined the details of its color coordinates in his 1912 publication.) and 1916, respectively.

=== Sand dune (Drab) ===
Sand Dune

Color coordinates
- Hex triplet: #967117
- sRGB^{B} (r, g, b): (150, 113, 23)
- HSV (h, s, v): (43°, 85%, 59%)
- CIELCh_{uv} (L, C, h): (50, 58, 58°)
- Source: ISCC-NBS
- ISCC–NBS descriptor: Moderate olive brown
- B: Normalized to [0–255] (byte)

Sand dune is a color that resembles that of a sand dune composed of dark-colored sand. The first recorded use of the term as a color name in English was in 1925.

The normalized color coordinates for sand dune are identical to the color names drab, mode beige and bistre brown, which were first recorded as color names in English, respectively, in 1686, 1928, and 1930.

=== Field drab ===
Field Drab

Color coordinates
- Hex triplet: #6C541E
- sRGB^{B} (r, g, b): (108, 84, 30)
- HSV (h, s, v): (42°, 72%, 42%)
- CIELCh_{uv} (L, C, h): (37, 38, 60°)
- Source: ISCC-NBS
- ISCC–NBS descriptor: Moderate olive brown
- B: Normalized to [0–255] (byte)

Field drab is one of the twelve official camouflage colors of the United States Army.

== Desert sand in human culture ==
=== Interior design ===
The tones of desert sand are called desert colors because they suggest the colors of the landscape of and of the design of the Native American cultures of the Southwestern United States. The desert colors are widely used (with both tones of sky blue or turquoise and tones of maroon to complement them) in Southwest Design.

=== Military ===
The colors desert sand, earth yellow, sand, and field drab are all on the list of the twelve standard camouflauge colors used by the United States Department of the Army.

== See also ==
- List of colors
