= Camel (color) =

Pale brown color

Color coordinates
- Hex triplet: #C19A6B
- sRGB^{B} (r, g, b): (193, 154, 107)
- HSV (h, s, v): (33°, 45%, 76%)
- CIELCh_{uv} (L, C, h): (66, 47, 52°)
- Source: ISCC-NBS
- ISCC–NBS descriptor: Light yellowish brown
- B: Normalized to [0–255] (byte)

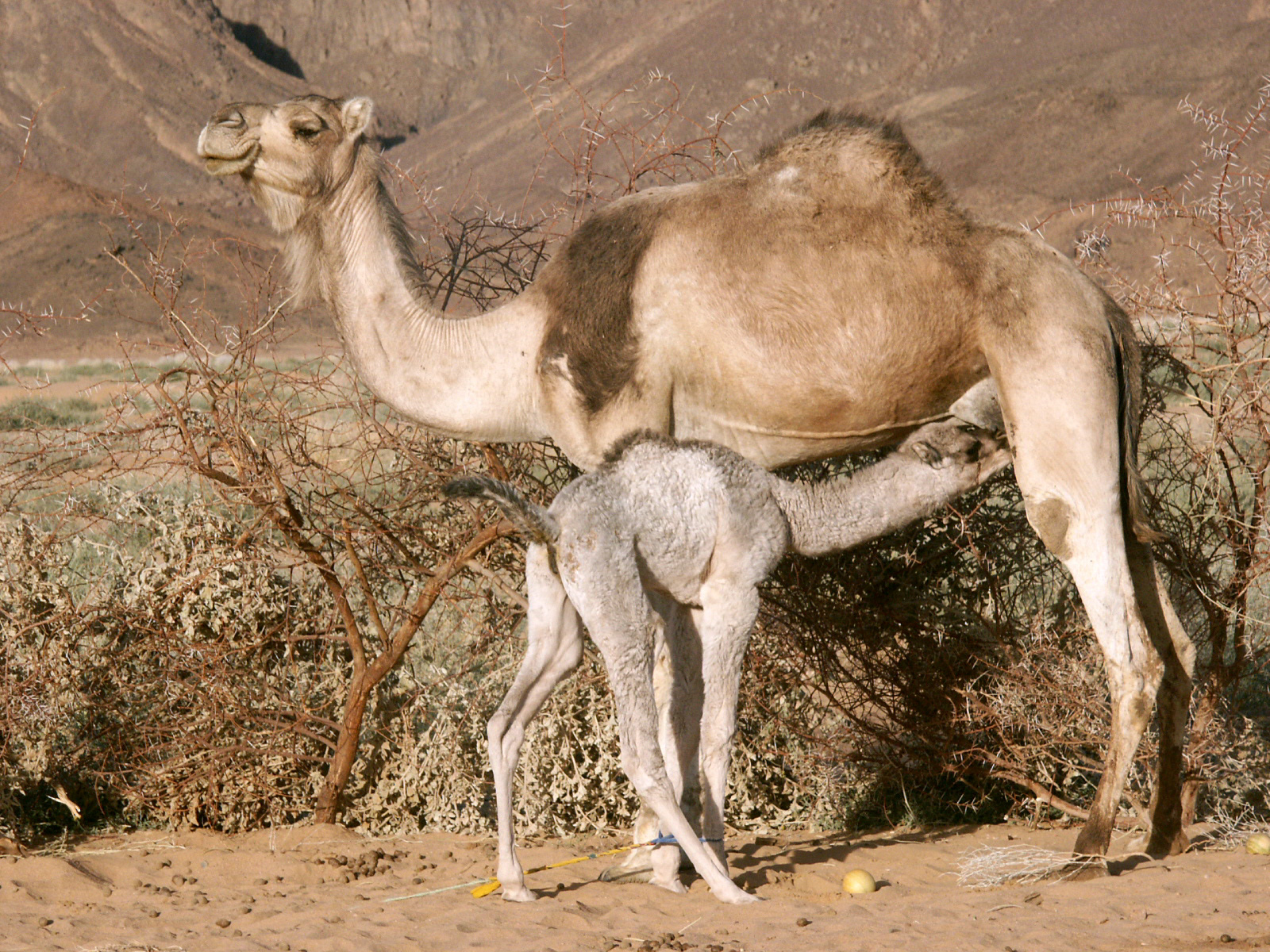
Camel calf feeding on her mother's milk

Camel is a color that resembles the color of the hair of a camel.

The first recorded use of camel as a color name in English was in 1916.

The normalized color coordinates for camel are identical to fallow, wood brown and desert, which were first recorded as color names in English in 1000, 1886, (Note: After recording "wood brown" in his 1886 book, Robert Ridgway further refined the details of its color coordinates in his 1912 publication.) and 1920, respectively.

== Fashion ==
Camel is the color of a specific type of overcoat known as a polo coat or camel-hair coat. In a 1951 Collier's magazine fashion article, it is said camel colored polo coats are proper to wear in the summer, in the country and in the U.S. South, but navy blue overcoats are proper to wear in the city and in autumn, winter and spring.

== See also ==
- List of colors
