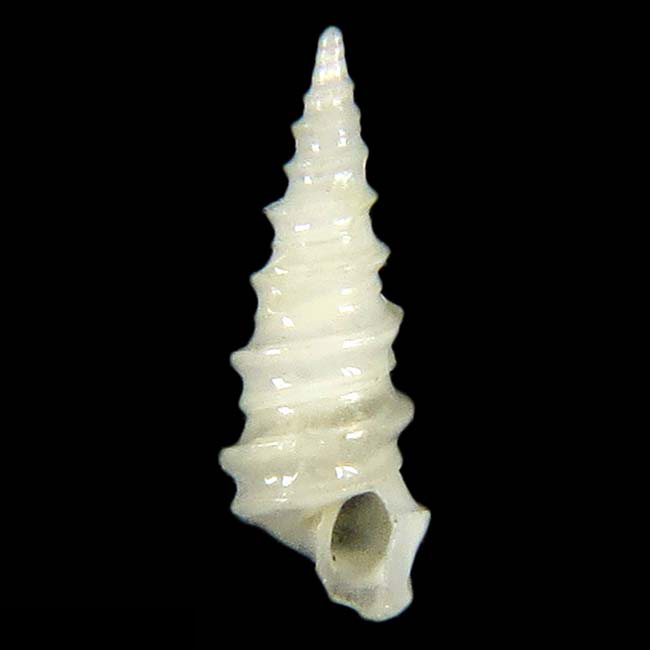

Scientific classification
- Kingdom: Animalia
- Phylum: Mollusca
- Class: Gastropoda
- Subclass: Caenogastropoda
- Order: Littorinimorpha
- Family: Eulimidae
- Genus: Cyclonidea
- Species: C. notabilis

Binomial name
- Cyclonidea notabilis Poppe, 2008

= Cyclonidea notabilis =

Species of gastropod

Cyclonidea notabilis is a species of sea snail, a marine gastropod mollusk in the family Eulimidae.

== Original description ==
- Poppe G.T. (2008) New Fissurellidae, Epitoniidae, Aclididae, Mitridae and Costellariidae from the Philippines. Visaya 2(3): 37-63. [Published August 2008].
