= Bistre =

Dark brown color

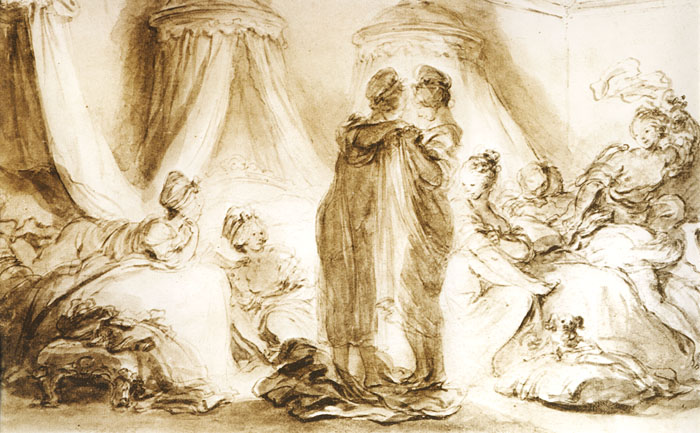
Le coucher des ouvrières, a wash painting using bistre pigment by Jean-Honoré Fragonard (1732–1806)

Bistre (or bister) is a pigment made from soot. Historically, beechwood was burned to produce the soot, which was boiled and diluted with water. Many Old Masters used bistre as the ink for their wash paintings.^{[1]} Bistre's appearance is generally of a dark grayish brown, with a yellowish cast.

Bistre has also been used to name colors resembling the pigment, typically shades of brown. The first recorded use of bistre as a color name in English was in 1727; another name for the color bistre is soot brown.

== Variations of bistre ==
=== Bistre ===
Bistre (Bister)

Color coordinates
- Hex triplet: #3D2B1F
- sRGB^{B} (r, g, b): (61, 43, 31)
- HSV (h, s, v): (24°, 49%, 24%)
- CIELCh_{uv} (L, C, h): (19, 14, 39°)
- Source: 99colors.net
- ISCC–NBS descriptor: Dark yellowish brown
- B: Normalized to [0–255] (byte)

Among other colors, bistre is the name of a very dark shade of grayish brown (the version shown on the immediate right).

=== Bistre brown ===
Bistre (ISCC-NBS #94) (M&P) (Bister Brown)

Color coordinates
- Hex triplet: #967117
- sRGB^{B} (r, g, b): (150, 113, 23)
- HSV (h, s, v): (43°, 85%, 59%)
- CIELCh_{uv} (L, C, h): (50, 58, 58°)
- Source: ISCC-NBS/M&P
- ISCC–NBS descriptor: Light olive brown
- B: Normalized to [0–255] (byte)

At right is displayed the color bistre brown, a medium brownish tone of the color bistre, also known as soot brown.

This is the tone of bistre that most closely matches the color sample in the 1930 book A Dictionary of Color by Maerz and Paul.

This tone of bistre is the color of the ink that was used by the Old Masters for their drawings.

The normalized color coordinates for bistre brown are identical to the color names drab, sand dune, and mode beige, which were first recorded as color names in English, respectively, in 1686, 1925, and 1928.

=== French bistre ===
Bistre (Pourpre.com) (French Bister)

Color coordinates
- Hex triplet: #856D4D
- sRGB^{B} (r, g, b): (133, 109, 77)
- HSV (h, s, v): (34°, 42%, 52%)
- CIELCh_{uv} (L, C, h): (48, 30, 55°)
- Source: Pourpre.com
- ISCC–NBS descriptor: Moderate olive brown
- B: Normalized to [0–255] (byte)

At right is displayed the color French bistre, which is the tone of bistre called bistre in the Pourpre.com color list, a color list widely popular in France.

For pictures of bistre colored postage stamps, see the French Wikipedia article on the color bistre.

=== Spanish bistre ===
Bistre (G&S) (Spanish Bister)

Color coordinates
- Hex triplet: #80755A
- sRGB^{B} (r, g, b): (128, 117, 90)
- HSV (h, s, v): (43°, 30%, 50%)
- CIELCh_{uv} (L, C, h): (50, 22, 68°)
- Source: Gallego & Sanz (2005)
- ISCC–NBS descriptor: Grayish olive
- B: Normalized to [0–255] (byte)

Spanish bistre is the color that is called bistre (the Spanish word for "bistre" is the same as the English word) in the Guía de coloraciones (Guide to colorations) by Rosa Gallego and Juan Carlos Sanz, a color dictionary published in 2005 that is widely popular in the Hispanophone realm.

== See also ==
- List of colors
- Trois crayons
