= Lion (color) =

Color of lions' fur

Color coordinates
- Hex triplet: #DECC9C
- sRGB^{B} (r, g, b): (222, 204, 156)
- HSV (h, s, v): (44°, 30%, 87%)
- CIELCh_{uv} (L, C, h): (82, 39, 69°)
- Source: ISCC-NBS
- ISCC–NBS descriptor: Grayish yellow
- B: Normalized to [0–255] (byte)

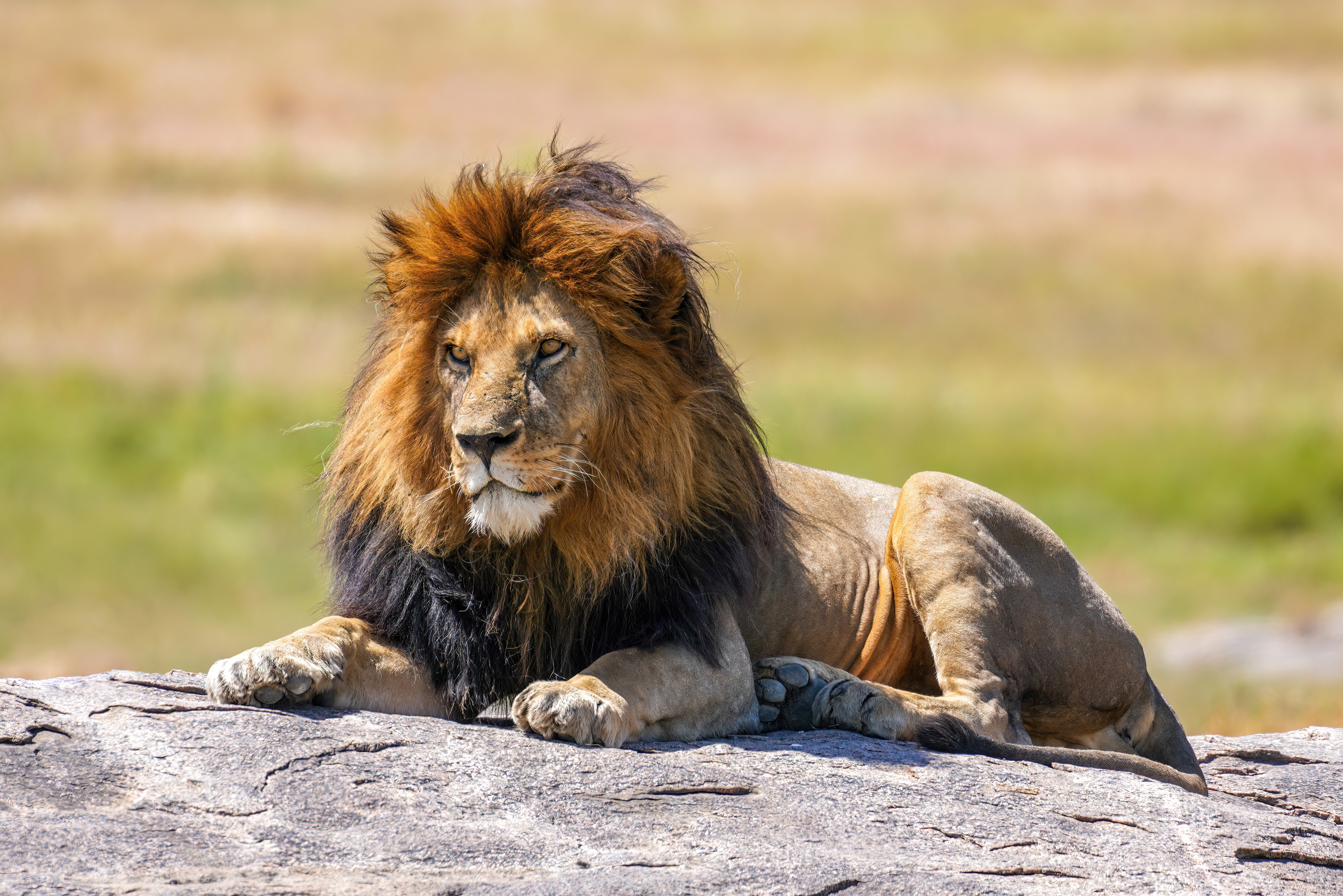
A male lion in Namibia

Lion is a color that is a representation of the average color of the fur of a lion.

The first recorded use of lion as a color name in English was in 1551.

== See also ==
- List of colors
