= Fallow (color) =

Pale brown color

Color coordinates
- Hex triplet: #C19A6B
- sRGB^{B} (r, g, b): (193, 154, 107)
- HSV (h, s, v): (33°, 45%, 76%)
- CIELCh_{uv} (L, C, h): (66, 47, 52°)
- Source: ISCC-NBS
- ISCC–NBS descriptor: Light yellowish brown
- B: Normalized to [0–255] (byte)

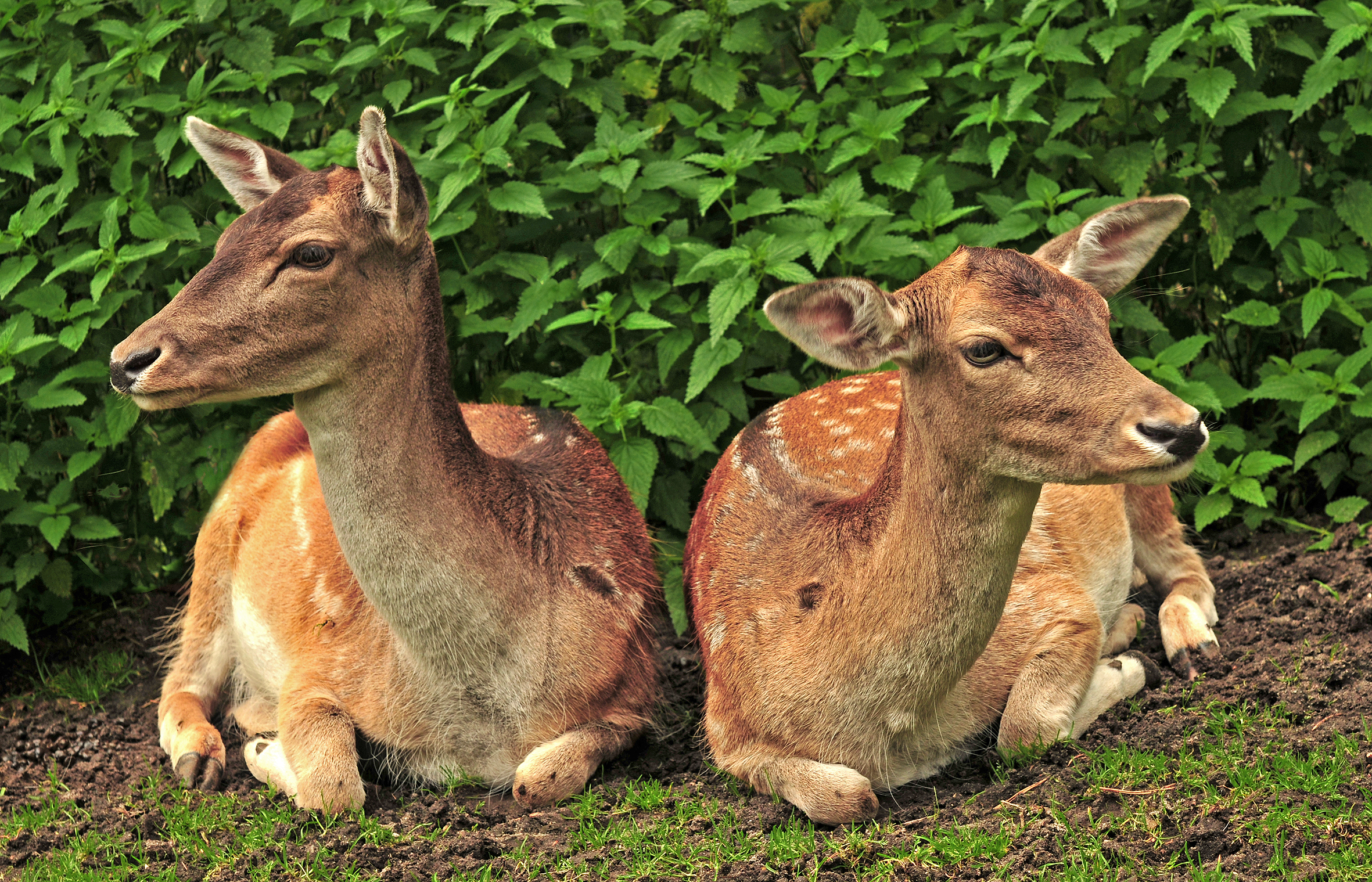
Fallow deer

Fallow is a pale brown color that is the color of withered foliage or sandy soil in fallow fields. This however is a post factum rationalization, and the etymologies are distinct.

Fallow is one of the oldest color names in English. The first recorded use of fallow as a color name in English was in the year 1000. The color was historically often used to describe the coats of some animals, such as fallow deer.

The normalized color coordinates for fallow are identical to wood brown, camel and desert, which were first recorded as color names in English in 1886, (Note: After publishing "wood brown" in his 1886 book, Robert Ridgway further refined the details of its color coordinates in his 1912 publication.) 1916, and 1920, respectively.

== See also ==
- List of colors
