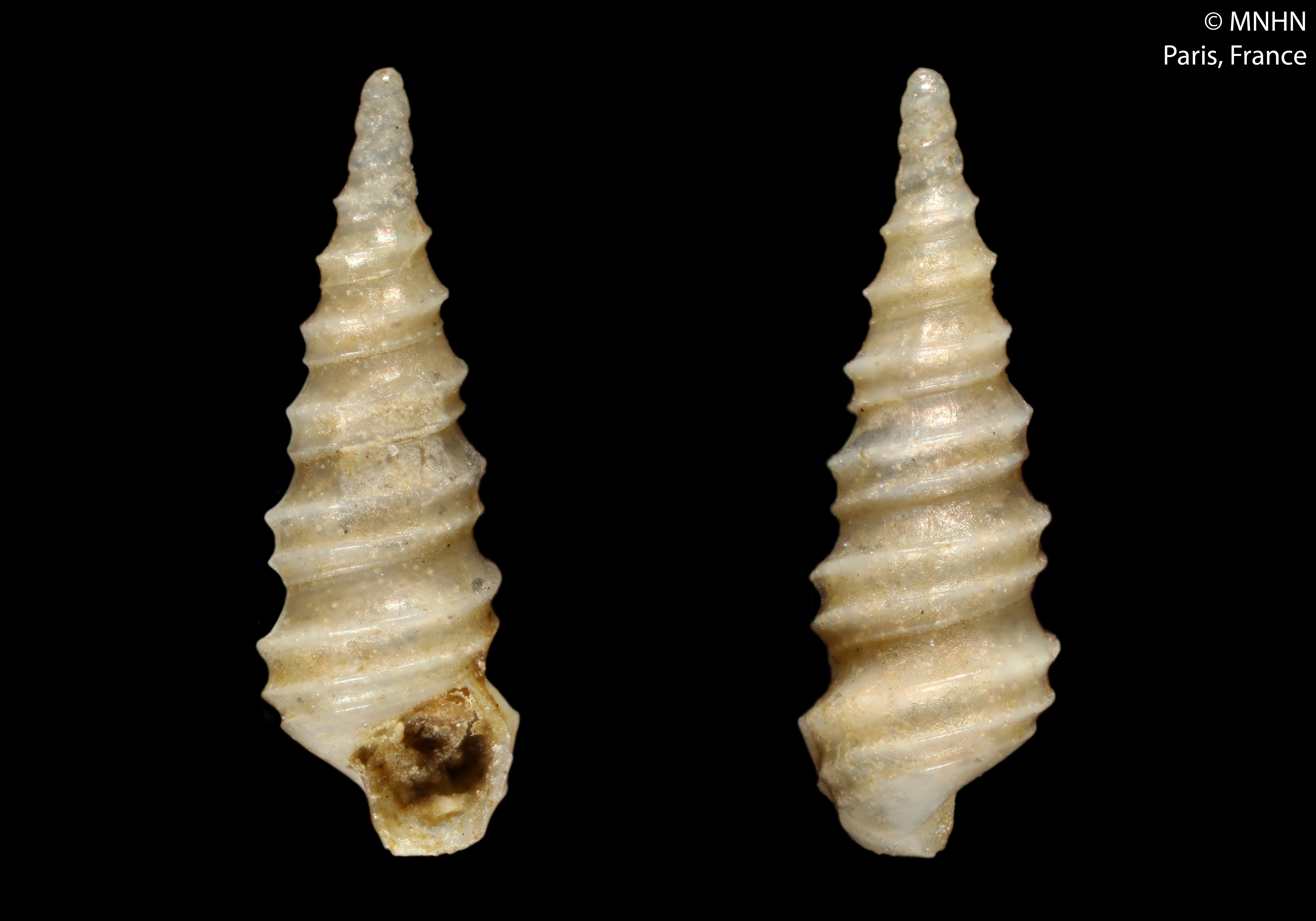
- Shell of Cyclonidea dondani (holotype at MNHN, Paris)

Scientific classification
- Kingdom: Animalia
- Phylum: Mollusca
- Class: Gastropoda
- Subclass: Caenogastropoda
- Order: Littorinimorpha
- Superfamily: Vanikoroidea
- Family: Eulimidae
- Genus: Cyclonidea; Laseron, 1956

Type species
- Cyclonidea carina Laseron, 1956

= Cyclonidea =

Genus of gastropods

Cyclonidea is a major genus of medium-sized sea snails, marine gastropod mollusks in the family Eulimidae.

== Species ==
- Cyclonidea carina Laseron, 1956
- Cyclonidea dondani Poppe & Tagaro, 2016
- Cyclonidea labiata (A. Adams, 1860)
- Cyclonidea notabilis Poppe, 2008
