= Tan (color) =

Pale tone of brown

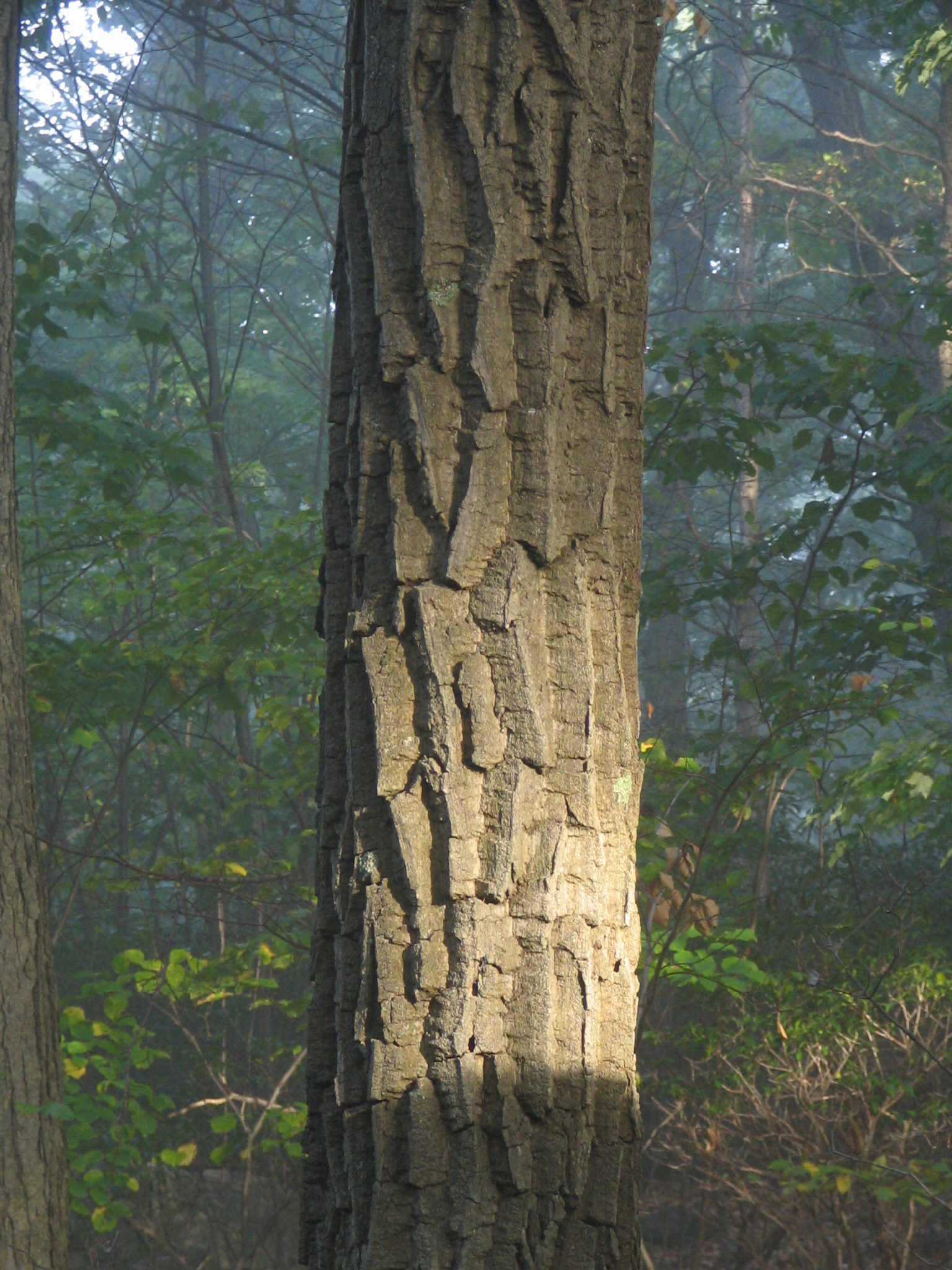
- Chestnut oak bark, formerly used in tanning

Common connotations
- skin color, sunbathing

Color coordinates
- Hex triplet: #D2B48C
- sRGB^{B} (r, g, b): (210, 180, 140)
- HSV (h, s, v): (34°, 33%, 82%)
- CIELCh_{uv} (L, C, h): (75, 39, 56°)
- Source: X11
- ISCC–NBS descriptor: Grayish yellow
- B: Normalized to [0–255] (byte)

Some shades of Tan
- Dark Tan

Tan is a pale tone of brown. The name is derived from tannum (oak bark) used in the tanning of leather.

The first documented usage of tan as a color name in English was in the year 1590.

Colors which are similar or may be considered synonymous to tan include tawny, tenné, and fulvous.

== Variations of tan ==
=== Sandy tan ===
Sandy Tan

Color coordinates
- Hex triplet: #FDD9B5
- sRGB^{B} (r, g, b): (253, 217, 181)
- HSV (h, s, v): (30°, 28%, 99%)
- CIELCh_{uv} (L, C, h): (89, 39, 51°)
- Source: Crayola
- ISCC–NBS descriptor: Pale orange yellow
- B: Normalized to [0–255] (byte)

Shown on the right is the color Sandy tan.

This color was formulated by Crayola in 2000 as a color for their markers.

=== Tan (Crayola) ===
Tan (Crayola)

Color coordinates
- Hex triplet: #FAA76C
- sRGB^{B} (r, g, b): (250, 167, 108)
- HSV (h, s, v): (25°, 57%, 98%)
- CIELCh_{uv} (L, C, h): (75, 79, 37°)
- Source: Crayola
- ISCC–NBS descriptor: Moderate orange
- B: Normalized to [0–255] (byte)

Shown on the right is the tone of orangish tan called tan since 1958 in Crayola crayons and 1990 in Crayola markers.

=== Windsor tan ===
Windsor Tan

Color coordinates
- Hex triplet: #AE6838
- sRGB^{B} (r, g, b): (174, 104, 56)
- HSV (h, s, v): (24°, 68%, 68%)
- CIELCh_{uv} (L, C, h): (51, 66, 34°)
- Source: ISCC-NBS
- ISCC–NBS descriptor: Strong brown
- B: Normalized to [0–255] (byte)

Shown on the right is the color Windsor tan.

The first documented use of Windsor tan as a color name in English was in 1925.

=== Tuscan tan ===
Tuscan Tan

Color coordinates
- Hex triplet: #A67B5B
- sRGB^{B} (r, g, b): (166, 123, 91)
- HSV (h, s, v): (26°, 45%, 65%)
- CIELCh_{uv} (L, C, h): (55, 41, 41°)
- Source: ISCC-NBS
- ISCC–NBS descriptor: Light brown
- B: Normalized to [0–255] (byte)

Displayed on the right is the color Tuscan tan.

The first recorded use of Tuscan tan as a color name in English was in 1926.

The normalized color coordinates for Tuscan tan are identical to café au lait and French beige, which were first recorded as color names in English in 1839 and 1927, respectively.

== In human culture ==
Military

- Tan is the color of the United States Army Rangers beret as well as Canada's Canadian Special Operations Regiment and Joint Task Force 2.

Sunbathing

- When a person sunbathes to make their skin darker, it is said that they are getting a tan.

United States politics

- The Barack Obama tan suit controversy was an incident when U.S. President Barack Obama wore a tan-colored suit at a press conference.

== See also ==
- Lists of colors
- Buff, a similar color
- Khaki, another similar color
- Tawny (color)
