= Drab (color) =

Term for cloths with specific colors such as dull browns, yellowish, or gray

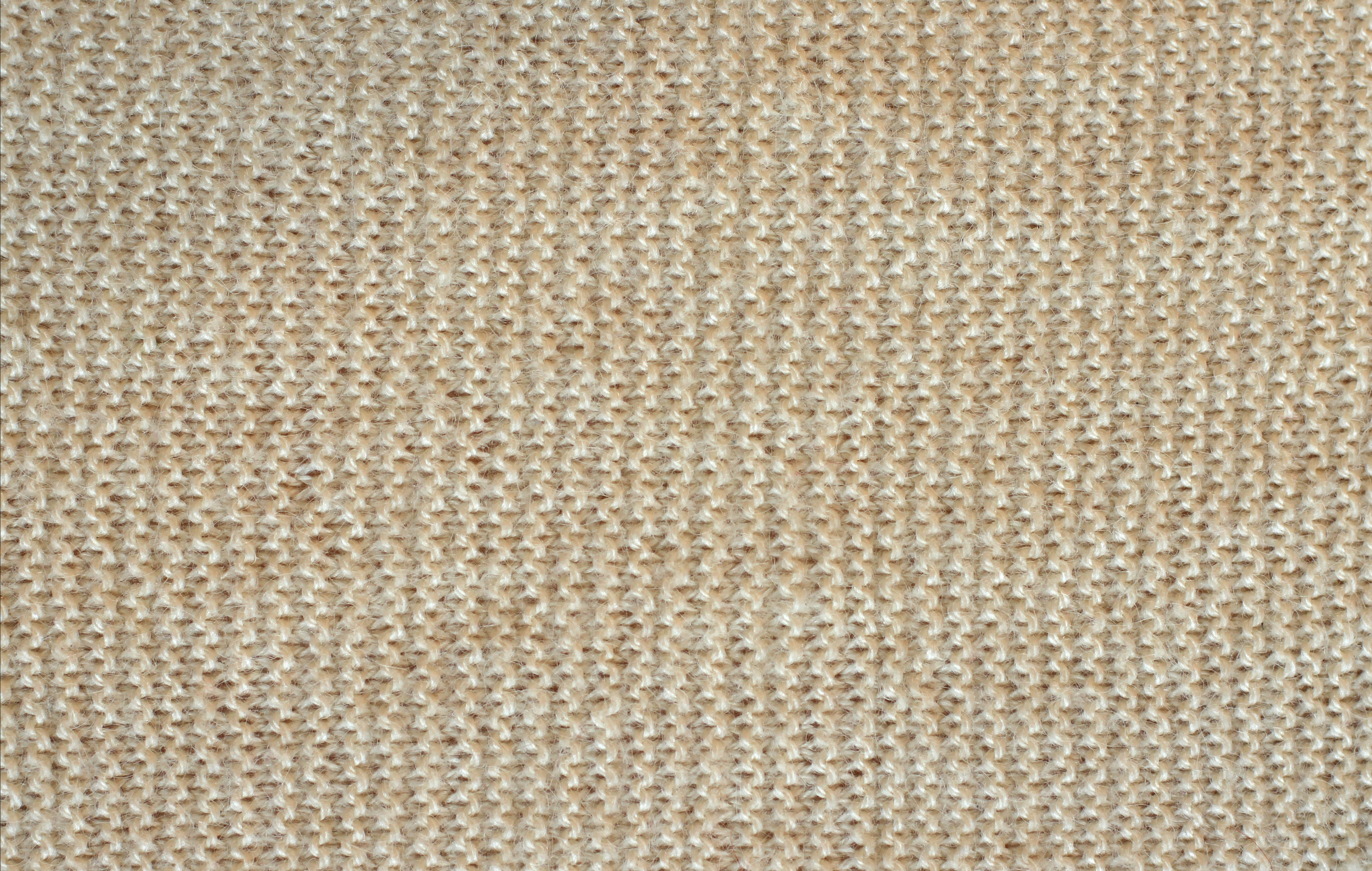
Drab is a dull light-brown color, the color of undyed wool cloth of the same name.

Drab is a dull, light-brown color. It originally took its name from a fabric of the same color made of undyed, homespun wool. The word was first used in English in 1686. It probably originated from the Old French word drap, which meant cloth. In 1897 the Sears catalog listed household paint colors including drab, light drab, Quaker drab, and olive drab.

By 1921, the color Drab was associated with potential, clairvoyance, instinct, precocity, and genius. The normalized color coordinates for drab are identical to sand dune, mode beige and bistre brown, which were first recorded as color names in English, respectively, in 1925, 1928, and 1930.

The word gradually came to mean dull, lifeless, or monotonous.

== Drab (cloth) ==
Drab was a term used for cloths with specific colors such as dull browns, yellowish or gray. The Drab of heavy woolen was produced in Yorkshire, England. It was a thick, sturdy structure used for overcoating.

=== In military uniforms ===
Several shades of drab have been used for military uniforms, including the above-mentioned light-brown color. The greenish shades of drab, known as olive drab, were used as the colors of the U.S. Army uniforms and equipment during World War II.
