= ISCC–NBS system =

International system of color designation

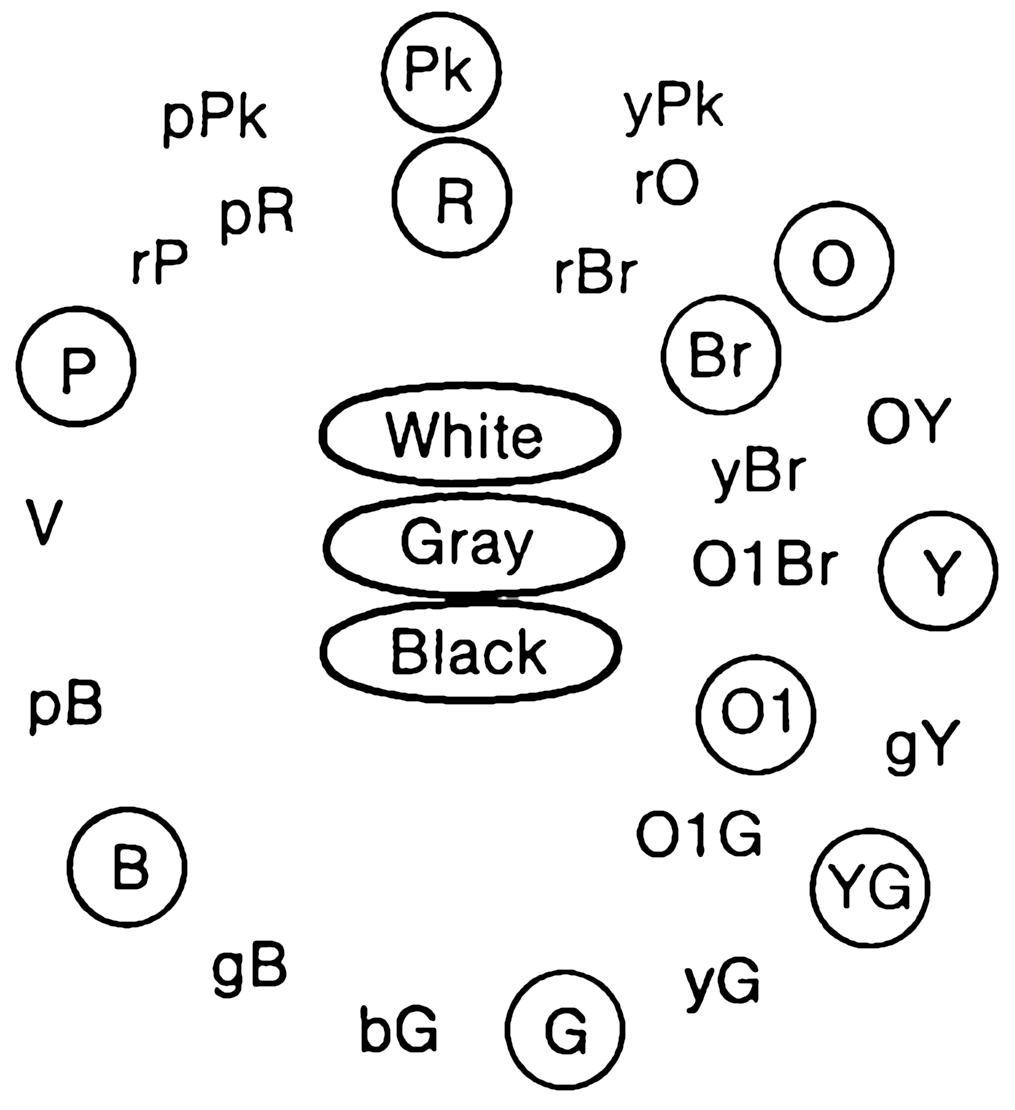
Hue relationships between the primary and secondary colors in the ISCC-NBS system of color designation

The ISCC–NBS System of Color Designation is a system for naming colors based on a set of 13 basic color terms and a small set of adjective modifiers. It was first established in the 1930s by a joint effort of the Inter-Society Color Council (ISCC), made up of delegates from various American trade organizations, and the National Bureau of Standards (NBS), a US government agency. As suggested in 1932 by the first chairman of the ISCC, the system's goal is to be "a means of designating colors in the United States Pharmacopoeia, in the National Formulary, and in general literature ... such designation to be sufficiently standardized as to be acceptable and usable by science, sufficiently broad to be appreciated and used by science, art, and industry, and sufficiently commonplace to be understood, at least in a general way, by the whole public." The system aims to provide a basis on which color definitions in fields from fashion and printing to botany and geology can be systematized and regularized, so that each industry need not invent its own incompatible color system.

In 1939, the system's approach was published in the Journal of Research of the National Bureau of Standards, and the ISCC formally approved the system, which consisted of a set of blocks within the color space defined by the Munsell color system as embodied by the Munsell Book of Color. Over the following decades, the ISCC–NBS system's boundaries were tweaked and its relation to various other color standards were defined, including for instance those for plastics, building materials, botany, paint, and soil.

After the definition of the Munsell system was slightly altered by its 1943 renotations, the ISCC–NBS system was redefined in the 1950s in relation to the new Munsell coordinates. In 1955, the NBS published The Color Names Dictionary, which cross-referenced terms from several other color systems and dictionaries, relating them to the ISCC–NBS system and thereby to each other. In 1965, the NBS published Centroid Color Charts made up of color samples demonstrating the central color in each category, as a physical representation of the system usable by the public, and also published The Universal Color Language, a more general system for color designation with various degrees of precision from completely generic (13 broad categories) to extremely precise (numeric values from spectrophotometric measurement). In 1976, The Color Names Dictionary and The Universal Color Language were combined and updated with the publication of Color: Universal Language and Dictionary of Names, the definitive source on the ISCC–NBS system.

== Color categories ==
The backbone of the ISCC–NBS system is a set of 13 basic color categories, made up of 10 hue names and three neutral categories. This includes the 11 basic color terms defined by Berlin and Kay, plus olive and yellow green:

- pink (Pk)
- red (R)
- orange (O)
- brown (Br)
- yellow (Y)
- olive (Ol)
- yellow green (YG)
- green (G)
- blue (B)
- purple (P)
- white (Wh)
- gray (Gy)
- black (Bk)

Between these lie a further 16 intermediate categories:

- reddish orange (rO)
- orange yellow (OY)
- greenish yellow (gY)
- yellowish green (yG)
- bluish green (bG)
- greenish blue (gB)
- purplish blue (pB)
- violet (V)
- reddish purple (rP)
- purplish red (pR)
- purplish pink (pPk)
- yellowish pink (yPk)
- reddish brown (rBr)
- yellowish brown (yBr)
- olive brown (OlBr)
- olive green (OlGr)

These categories can be further subdivided into 267 named categories by combining a hue name with modifiers (the example centroids shown here are for the hue name "purple"):

- vivid (v.)
- brilliant (brill.)
- strong (s.)
- deep (deep)
- very deep (v. deep)
- very light (v.l.)
- light (l.)
- moderate (m.)
- dark (d.)
- very dark (v.d.)
- very pale (v.p.)
- pale or light grayish (p., l. gy.)
- grayish (gy.)
- dark grayish (d. gy.)
- blackish (bk.)
- -ish white (-ish Wh)
- light -ish gray (l. -ish Gy)
- -ish gray (-ish Gy)
- dark -ish gray (d. -ish Gy)
- -ish black (-ish Bk)

However, not all modifiers apply to every hue name. For example, there is no brilliant brown or very deep pink.

Each of the 267 ISCC–NBS categories is defined by one or more "blocks" within the color solid of the Munsell color system, where each block includes colors falling in a specific interval in hue, value, and chroma, resulting in a shape which "might be called a sector of a right cylindrical annulus (like a piece of pie with the point bitten off)". The blocks fill the color solid, and are non-overlapping, so that every point falls into exactly one block.

== The Color Names Dictionary ==
One of the primary original goals of the ISCC–NBS system was to relate several other common color systems and charts to a common frame of reference. To that end, in the late 1940s, the creators of the ISCC–NBS system measured several other significant color standards and charts, either spectrophotometrically or visually with reference to the Munsell Book of Color.

== Bibliography ==
In chronological order:

- Deane B. Judd and Kenneth L. Kelly (1939). "Method of designating colors and a dictionary". Journal of Research of the National Bureau of Standards 23, p 355. RP1239.
- Dorothy Nickerson and Sidney Newhall (1941). "Central notations for ISCC–NBS color names". Journal of the Optical Society of America 31, p 587.
- Dorothy Nickerson and Sidney Newhall (1943). "A psychological color solid". Journal of the Optical Society of America 33, p 419.
- Kenneth L. Kelly and Deane B. Judd (1955). The ISCC–NBS method of designating colors and a dictionary of color names. NBS Circ. 553. Washington DC: US Government Printing Office.
- Kenneth L. Kelly (1965) "A Universal Color Language". Color engineering. 3(16).
- Inter-Society Color Council, National Bureau of Standards (1965). ISCC-NBS Color-name Charts Illustrated with Centroid Colors: (Supplement to NBS Circ. 533). Standard sample No. 2106.
- Kenneth L. Kelly and Deane B. Judd (1976). Color: Universal Language and Dictionary of Names. NBS Special Publication 440. Washington DC: US Department of Commerce.
