= Sienna =

Earth pigment

Color coordinates
- Hex triplet: #882D17
- sRGB^{B} (r, g, b): (136, 45, 23)
- HSV (h, s, v): (12°, 83%, 53%)
- CIELCh_{uv} (L, C, h): (32, 73, 18°)
- ISCC–NBS descriptor: Strong reddish brown
- B: Normalized to [0–255] (byte)

Sienna (from Italian terra di Siena 'earth of Siena') is an earth pigment containing iron oxide and manganese oxide. In its natural state, it is yellowish brown, and it is called raw sienna. When heated, it becomes a reddish brown, and it is called burnt sienna. It takes its name from the city-state of Siena, where it was produced during the Renaissance. Along with ochre and umber, it was one of the first pigments to be used by humans, and is found in many cave paintings. Since the Renaissance, it has been one of the brown pigments most widely used by artists.

The first recorded use of sienna as a color name in English was in 1760.

The normalized color coordinates for sienna are identical to kobe, first recorded as a color name in English in 1924.

== Earth colors ==
Like the other earth colors, such as yellow ochre and umber, sienna is a clay which is partially composed of iron oxides. In the case of sienna, the most prevalent iron oxides are limonite (which in its natural state has a yellowish color), and goethite. In addition to iron oxides, natural or raw sienna is also composed of manganese oxide, which makes it darker than ochre. Aluminum oxides have also been found in the soil at very low levels. When heated, the limonite and goethite is dehydrated and turns partially to hematite, which gives it a reddish-brown color. Sienna is lighter in shade than raw umber, which is also clay with iron oxide, but which has a significantly higher content of manganese (5 to 20 percent) making it greenish brown or dark brown in color. When heated, raw umber becomes burnt umber, a very dark brown.

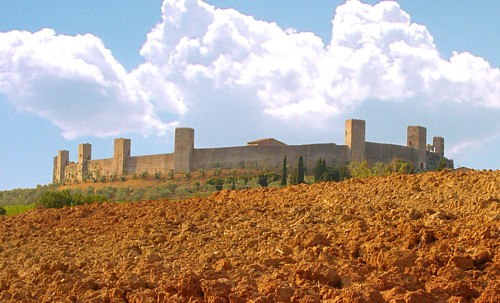
The clay soil of Tuscany (here near Monteriggioni) is rich in limonite, or hydrated iron oxide, the main component of sienna pigment.

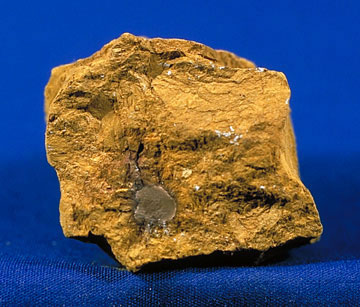
Limonite, a clay containing iron oxide, which gives sienna pigment its color.

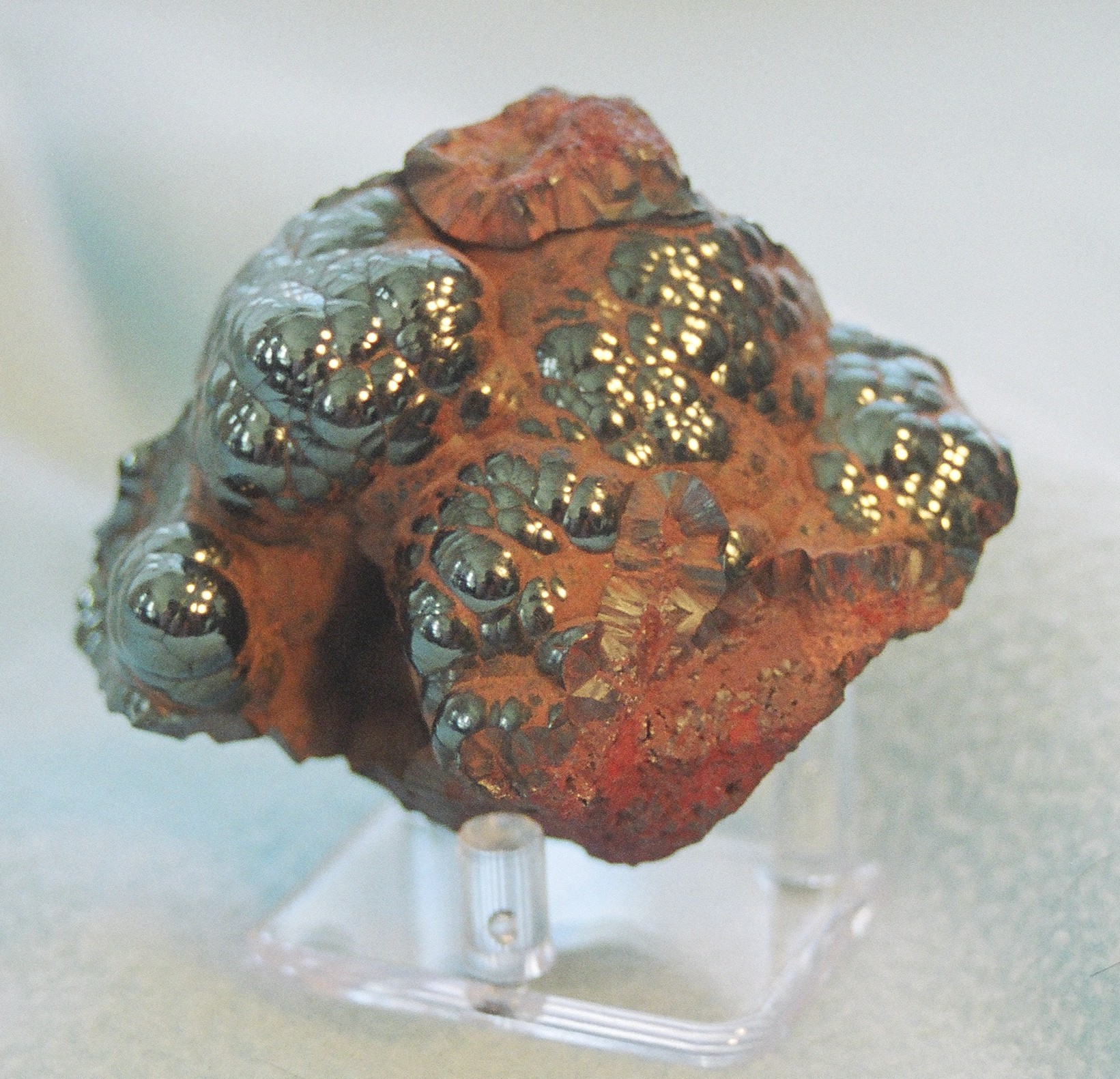
Hematite. When roasted, limonite is converted partially to hematite and its colors turns more reddish.

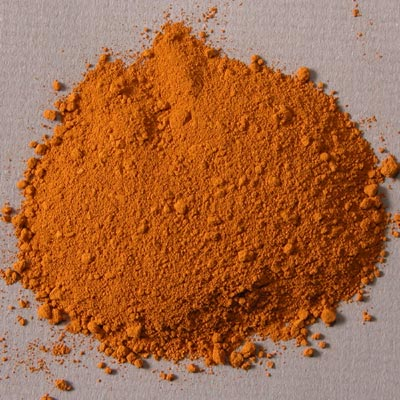
After heating, the pigment becomes the color burnt sienna.

== History ==
The pigment sienna was known and used in its natural form by the ancient Romans. It was mined near Arcidosso (formerly under Sienese control, now in the province of Grosseto) on Monte Amiata in southern Tuscany. It was called terra rossa (red earth), terra gialla (yellow earth), or terra di Siena.

In the Middle Ages the sienna pigments were used by artists such as Duccio di Buoninsegna and other painters who lived and worked in and around the Republic of Siena. Duccio was painting with earth pigments in the late 13th century until his death in the early 14th century.

During the Renaissance, Giorgio Vasari made note of the pigment under the name terra rossa. Along with umber and yellow ochre, sienna became one of the standard browns used by artists from the 16th to 19th centuries, including Caravaggio (1571–1610) and Rembrandt (1606–1669), who used all three earth colors in his palette. Cross sections of Rembrandt's works, analyzed by X-Ray and infrared lenses, reveal that he used variations of sienna to prime his paintings. This was especially true for some of his later works.

Although these artists are known to have used sienna and its variations in their works, scholars have pointed out that the pigment was not commonly referenced by name in European sources until the mid-eighteenth century.

By the 1940s, the traditional Italian sources of the pigment were nearly exhausted. Much of today's sienna production is carried out in the Italian islands of Sardinia and Sicily, while other major deposits are found in the Appalachian Mountains, where it is often found alongside the region's iron deposits. It is also still produced in the French Ardennes in the small town of Bonne Fontaine near Ecordal. The chemical composition of the umbers produced in France are distinctly different from the original siennas.

In the 20th century, pigments began to be produced using synthetic iron oxide rather than natural deposits. The labels on paint tubes indicate whether they contain natural or synthetic ingredients. PY-43 indicates natural raw sienna, while PR-102 indicates natural burnt sienna.

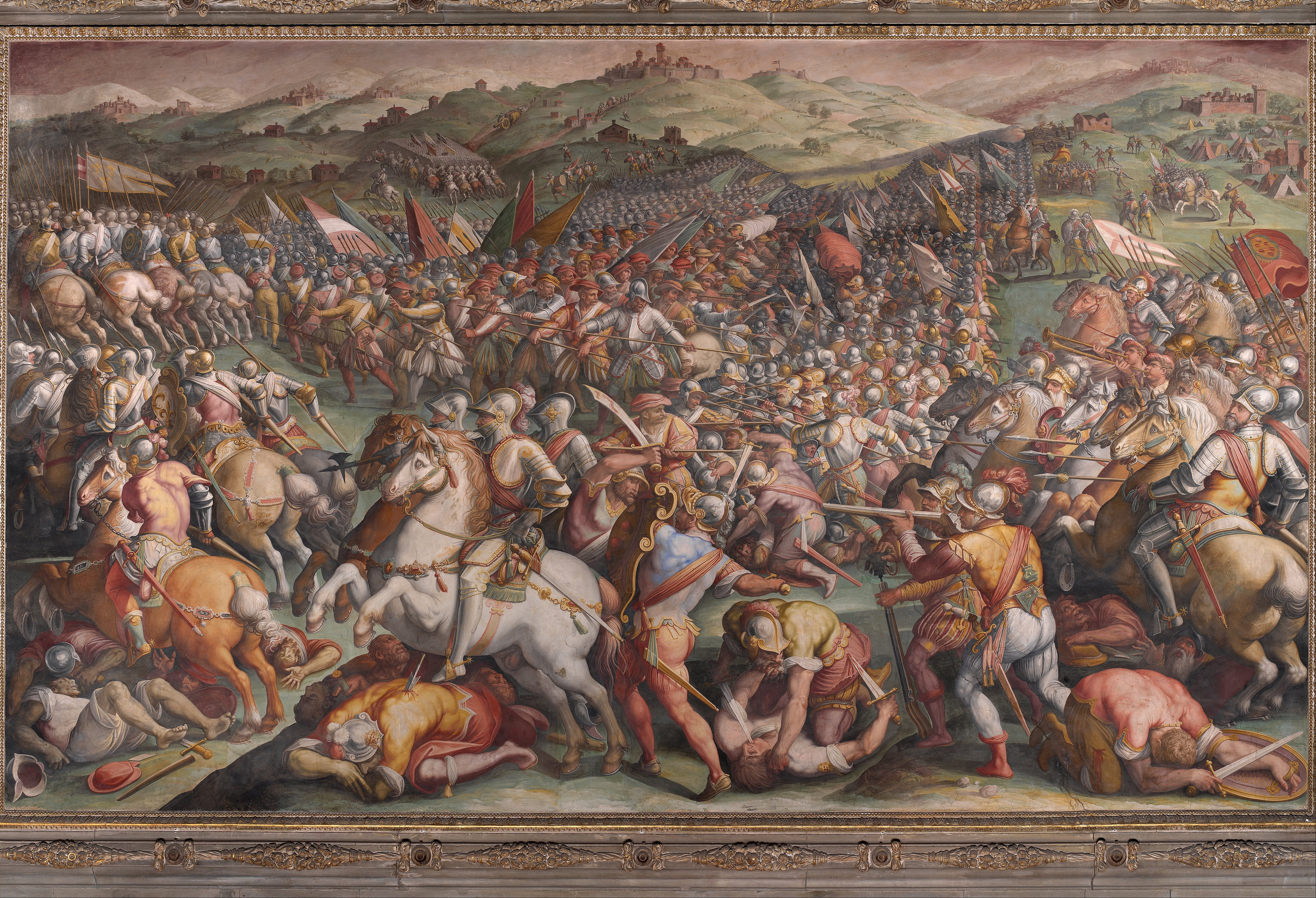
Giorgio Vasari (1511–1574) used earth colors, including ochre and sienna, in his frescos such this in the Hall of the Five Hundred at the Palazzo Vecchio in Florence. In his writings Vasari referred to sienna as terra rossa.

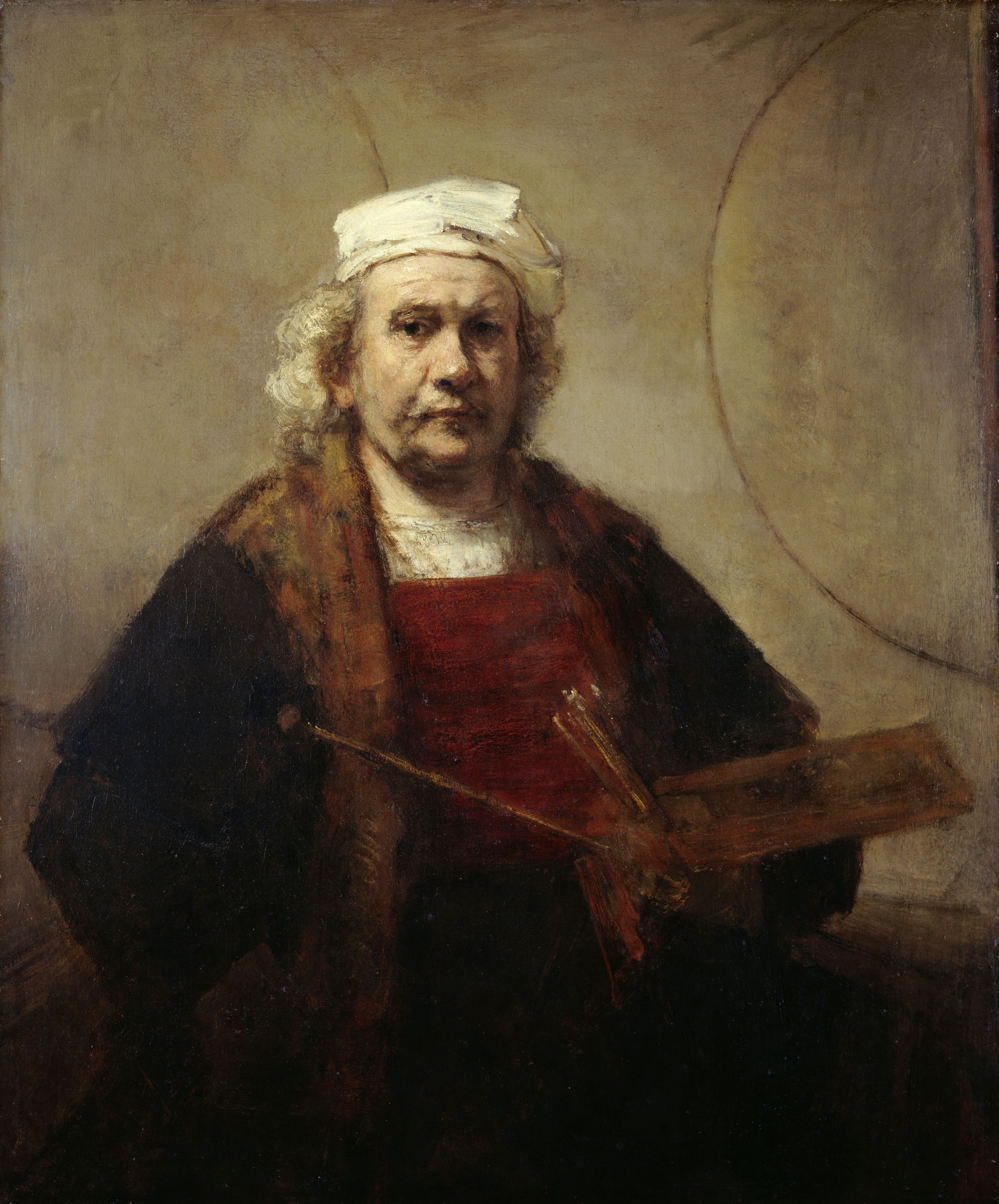
Rembrandt van Rijn used all the earth pigments (sienna, ochre, and umber) to create his rich and complex browns.

== Historical preparation ==
Historically, the pigment was prepared by taking lumps of earth and placing them into a fire either using a crucible or shovel, in order to induce the necessary chemical reaction. In some seventeenth-century accounts, the lumps of earth are supposed to be pulverized, or at least broken down into smaller pieces, first. However, the instructions from the time period are inconsistent. Furthermore, the amount of time that the pigment needs to be heated is based on what the artist preparing the pigment desires. Generally, a longer exposure to heat leads to a deeper red hue.

== Shades and variations ==
Sienna varies slightly in shade and hue based on the chemical composition of the soil and the temperature and length of time in which it is prepared. A higher composition of iron oxide in the soil leads to a deeper red pigment.

There is no single agreed standard for the color of sienna, and the name is used today for a wide variety of hues and shades. They vary by country and color list, and there are many proprietary variations offered by paint companies. The color box at the top of the article shows one variation from the ISCC-NBS color list.

=== Raw sienna ===
Terra di Siena naturale, or raw sienna (Italian)

Colour coordinates
- Hex triplet: #965434
- sRGB^{B} (r, g, b): (150, 84, 52)
- HSV (h, s, v): (20°, 65%, 59%)
- CIELCh_{uv} (L, C, h): (43, 57, 29°)
- Source: Ferrario 1919: Cartella colori, colour 69
- ISCC–NBS descriptor: Strong brown
- B: Normalized to [0–255] (byte)

Raw sienna is a yellowish-brown natural earth pigment, composed primarily of iron oxide hydroxide. The box shows the color of the pigment in its natural, or raw state. It contains a large quantity of iron oxide and a small quantity (about five percent) of manganese oxide.

This kind of pigment is known as yellow ochre, yellow earth, limonite, or terra gialla. The pigment name for natural raw sienna from the Color Index International, shown on the labels of oil paints, is PY-43.

This box at right shows a variation of raw sienna from the Italian Ferrario 1919 color list.

=== Burnt sienna ===
Terra di Siena bruciata, or burnt sienna (Italian)

Colour coordinates
- Hex triplet: #623034
- sRGB^{B} (r, g, b): (98, 48, 52)
- HSV (h, s, v): (355°, 51%, 38%)
- CIELCh_{uv} (L, C, h): (27, 32, 8°)
- Source: Ferrario 1919: Cartella colori, colour 77
- ISCC–NBS descriptor: Deep reddish brown
- B: Normalized to [0–255] (byte)

Burnt sienna contains a large proportion of anhydrous iron oxide. It is made by heating raw sienna, which dehydrates the iron oxide, changing it partially to hematite, giving it rich reddish-brown color.

The pigment is also known as red earth, red ochre, and terra rossa. On the Color Index International, the pigment is known as PR-102.

This version is from the Italian Ferrario 1919 color list.

The first recorded use of burnt sienna as a color name in English was in 1853.

==== Burnt sienna pigment (Maerz and Paul) ====
Burnt sienna (Maerz and Paul)

Colour coordinates
- Hex triplet: #E97451
- sRGB^{B} (r, g, b): (233, 116, 81)
- HSV (h, s, v): (14°, 65%, 91%)
- CIELCh_{uv} (L, C, h): (62, 98, 22°)
- Source: Maerz and Paul
- ISCC–NBS descriptor: Strong reddish orange
- B: Normalized to [0–255] (byte)

This variation of burnt sienna is from the Maerz and Paul "A Dictionary of Color" from 1930. It is considerably lighter than most other versions of burnt sienna. It was a mix of burnt orange and raw sienna.

=== Dark sienna (ISCC-NBS) ===
Dark sienna

Colour coordinates
- Hex triplet: #3C1414
- sRGB^{B} (r, g, b): (60, 20, 20)
- HSV (h, s, v): (0°, 67%, 24%)
- CIELCh_{uv} (L, C, h): (13, 22, 12°)
- Source: ISCC-NBS
- ISCC–NBS descriptor: Dark reddish brown
- B: Normalized to [0–255] (byte)

This infobox shows the color dark sienna from the ISCC-NBS color list.

=== Sienna (X11 color) ===
Sienna (X11 web colour)

Colour coordinates
- Hex triplet: #A0522D
- sRGB^{B} (r, g, b): (160, 82, 45)
- HSV (h, s, v): (19°, 72%, 63%)
- CIELCh_{uv} (L, C, h): (44, 68, 27°)
- Source: X11
- ISCC–NBS descriptor: Strong brown
- B: Normalized to [0–255] (byte)

The web color sienna is defined by the list of X11 colors used in web browsers and web design.

== See also ==
- Lists of colors
- List of inorganic pigments
