= Tan Book =

Tan Book may refer to:

- The initial name of the Beige Book, the Summary of Commentary on Current Economic Conditions, a qualitative report on the state of the US economy based on anecdotal observations of the United States Federal Reserve Board, following its renaming from the Red Book in 1983.
- TAN Books, a Catholic American book distributor and publisher out of Charlotte, North Carolina.
