= Beige =

Color

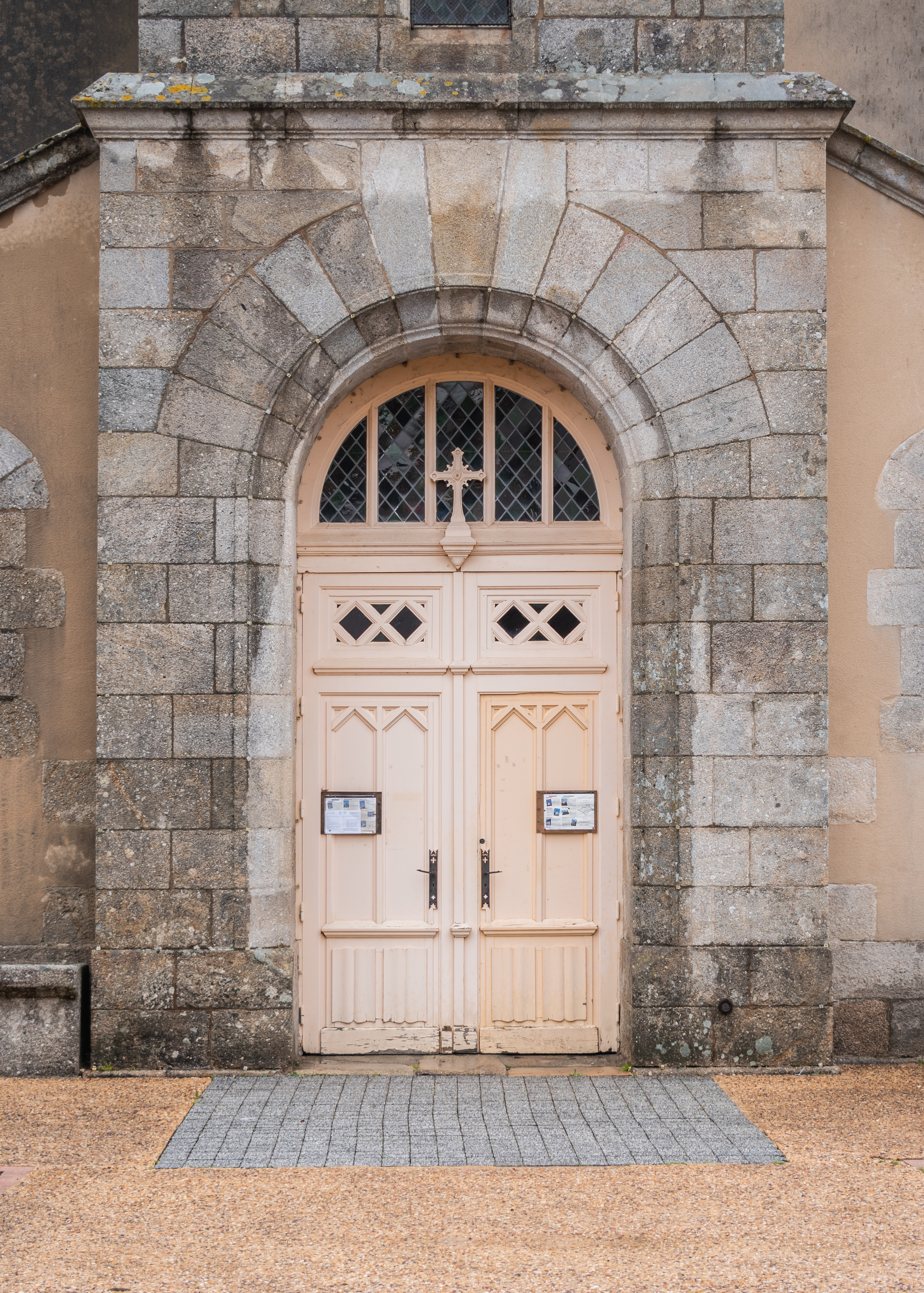
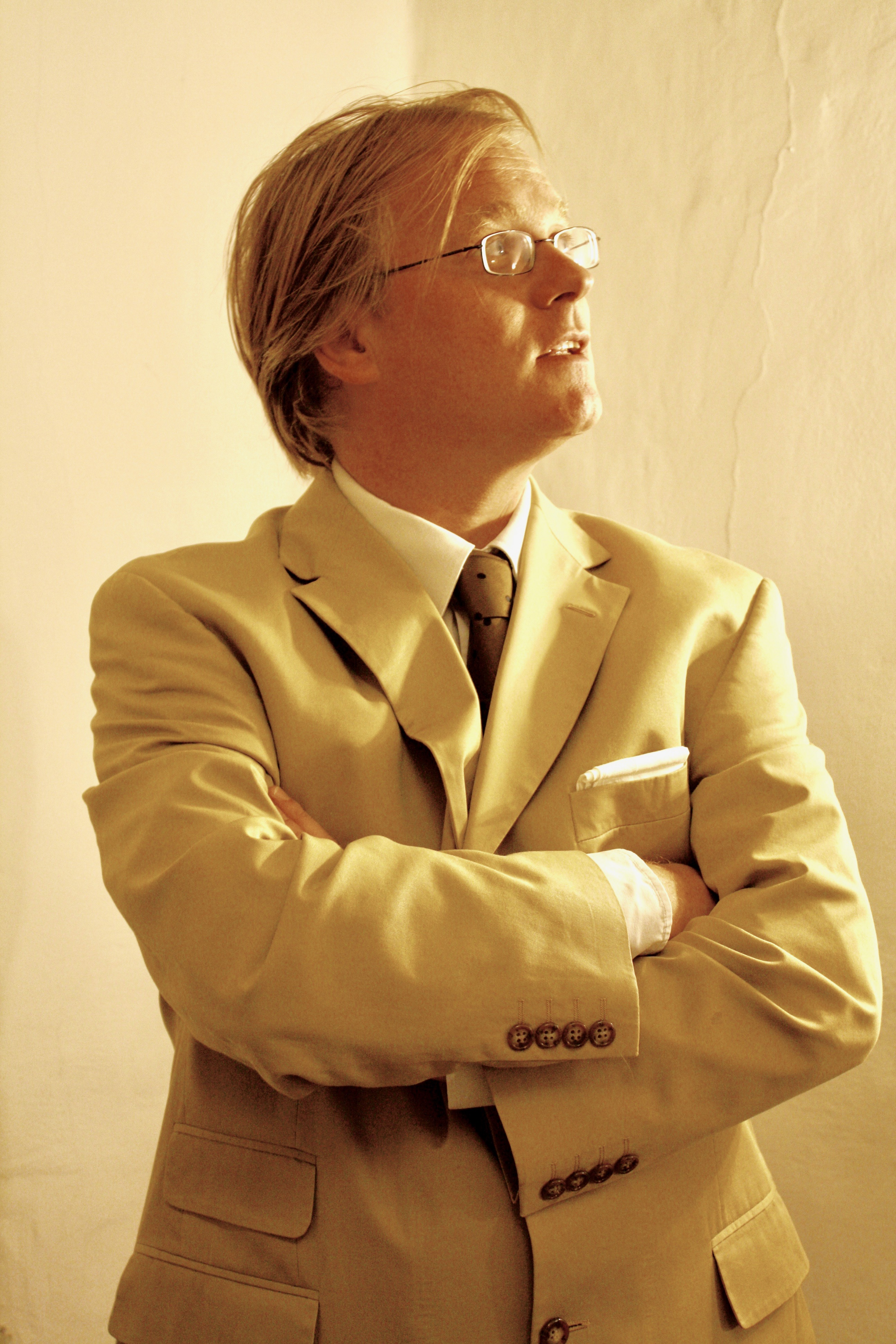
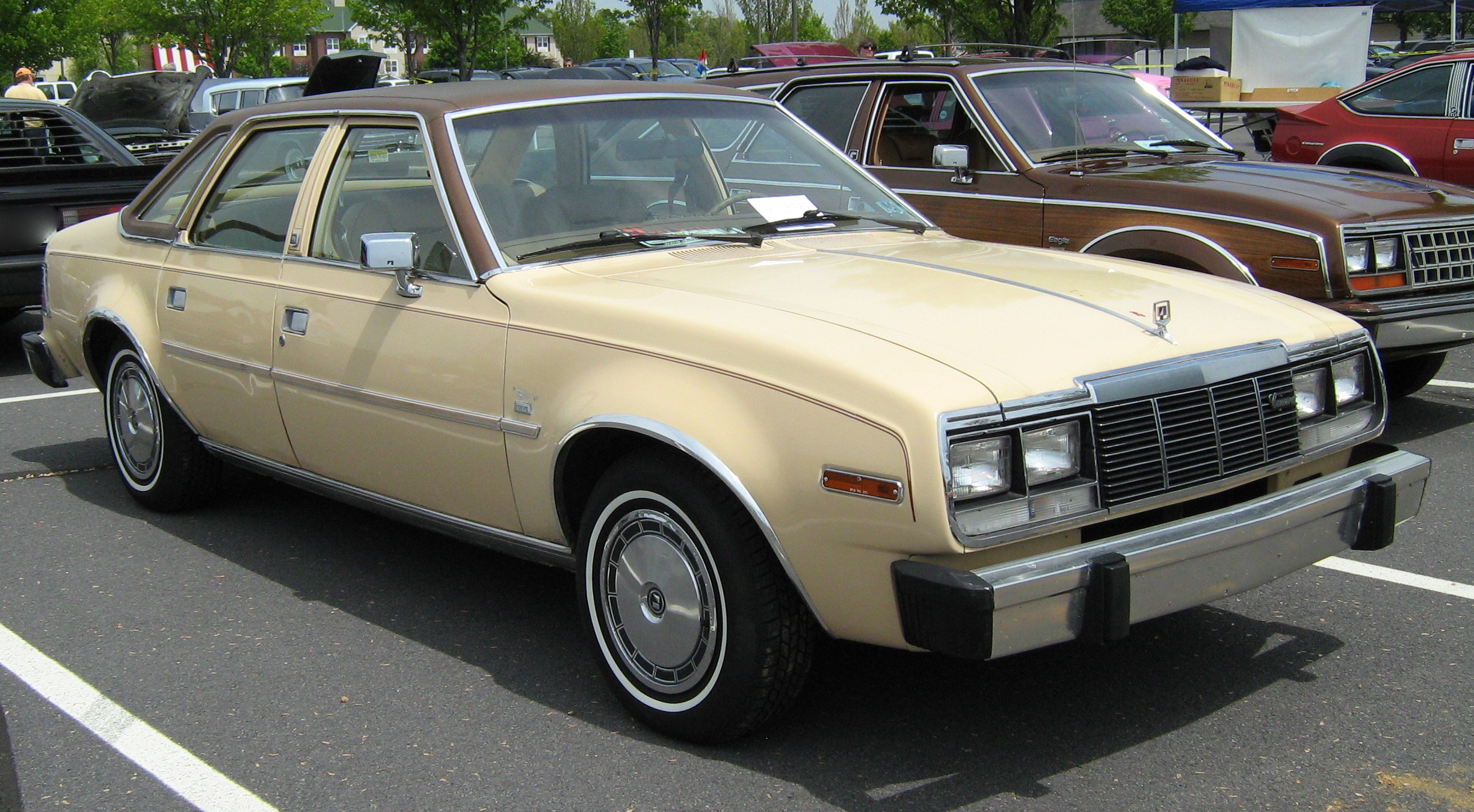
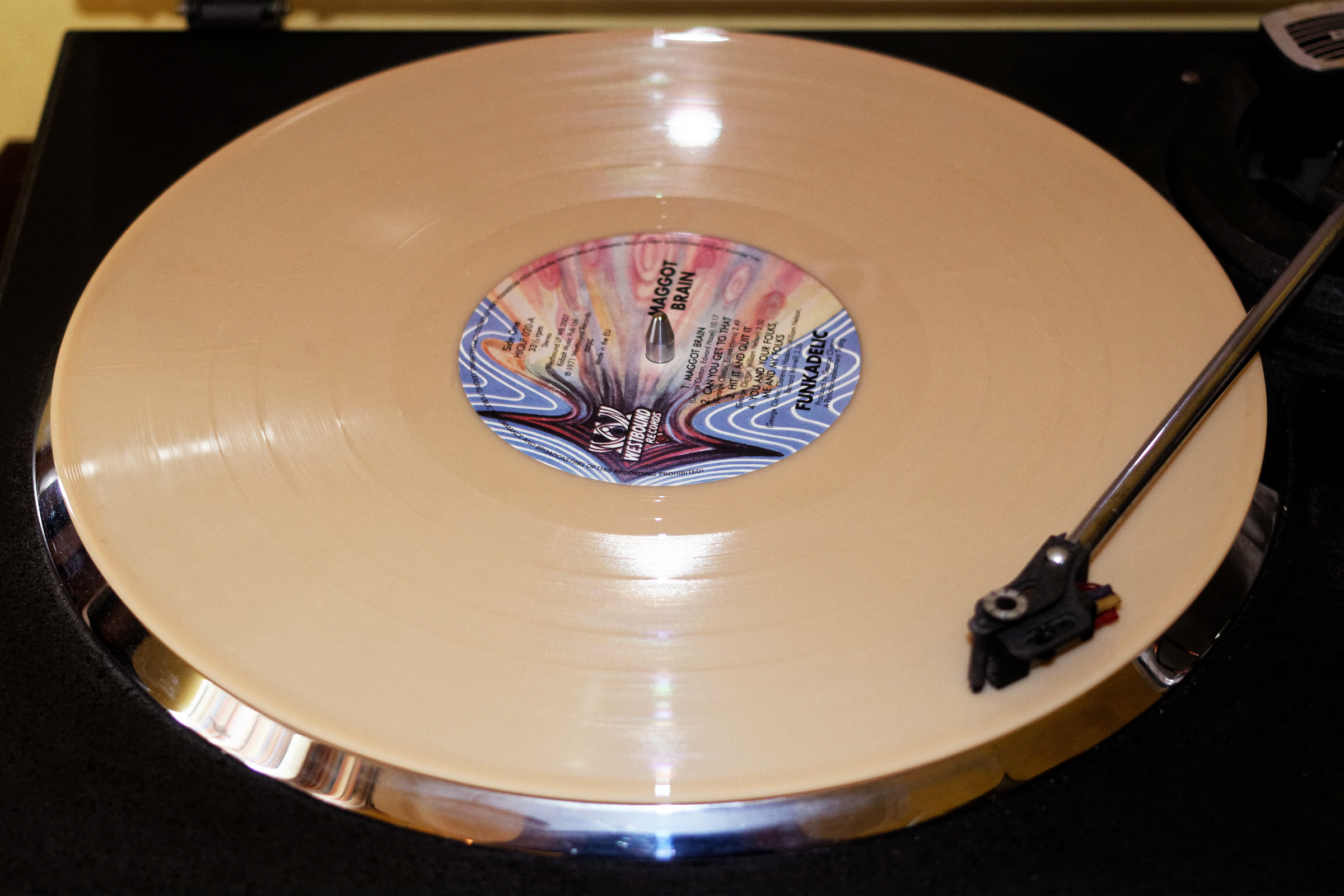
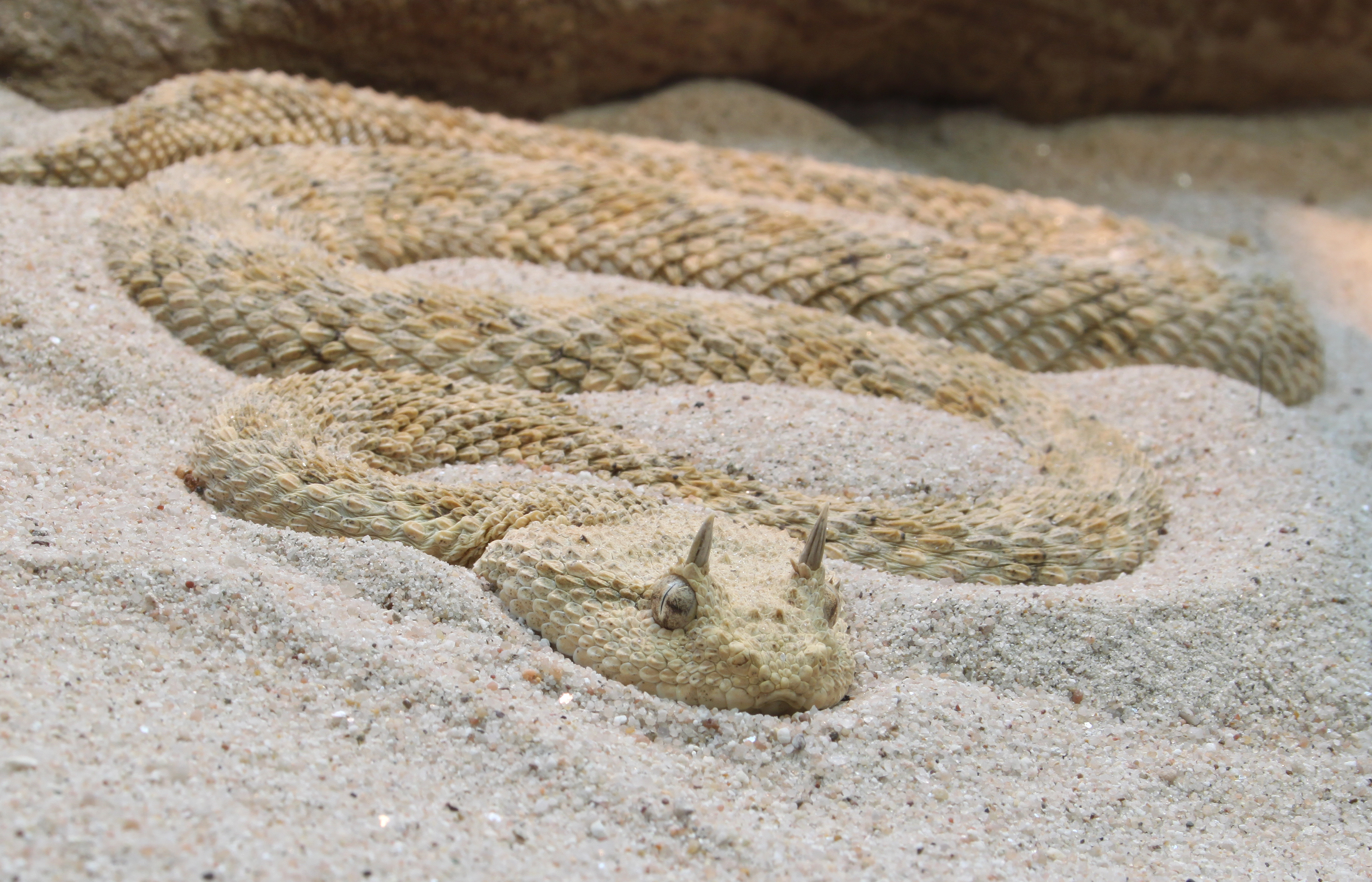
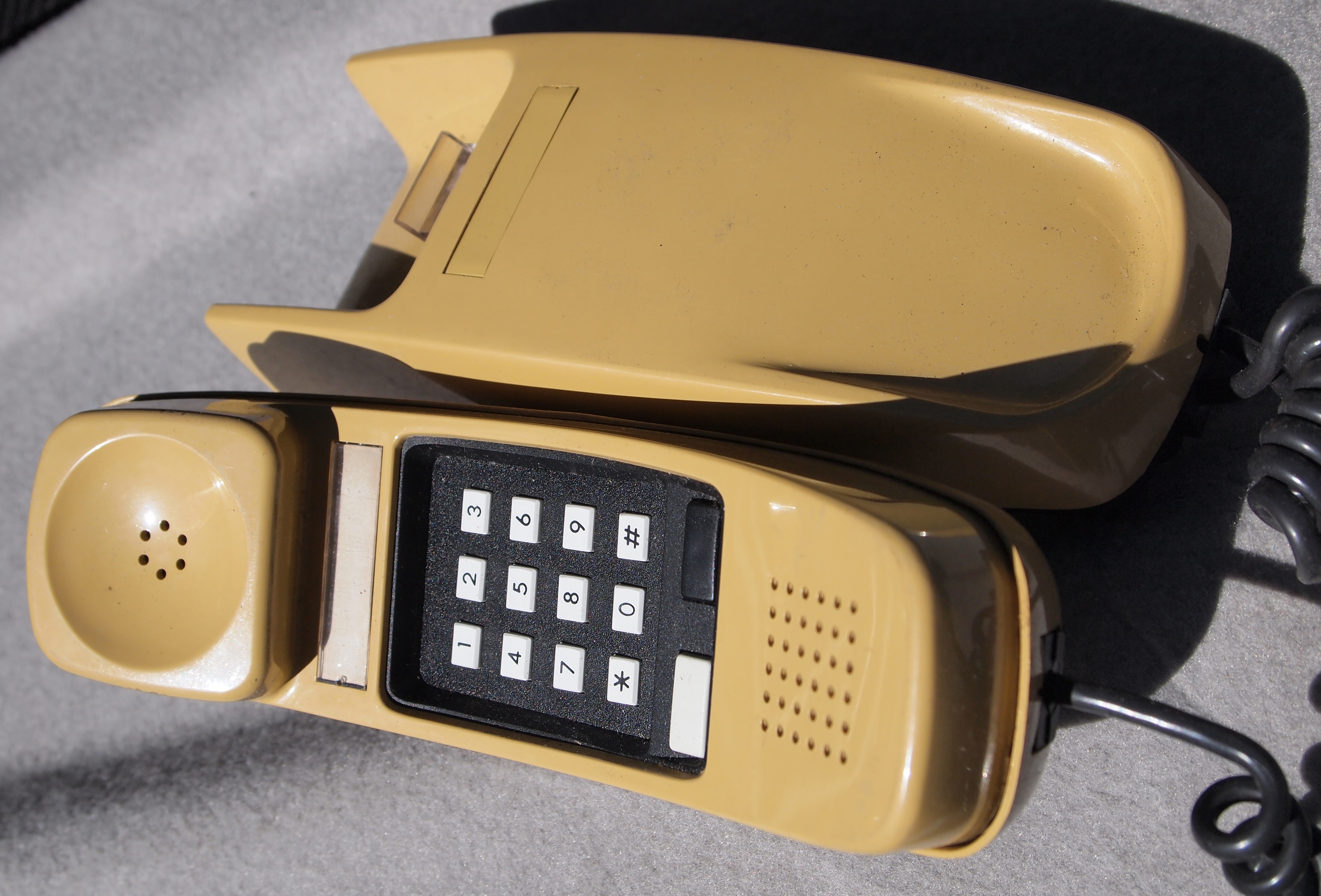
- Clockwise, from top left: Portal of the Saint Anthony church in Chamboret; Klaus-Jürgen Bauer, German architect and author; 1981 AMC Concord; Push-button telephone; Saharan horned viper; Colored vinyl record.

Color coordinates
- Hex triplet: #F5F5DC
- sRGB^{B} (r, g, b): (245, 245, 220)
- HSV (h, s, v): (60°, 10%, 96%)
- CIELCh_{uv} (L, C, h): (96, 19, 86°)
- Source: X11
- ISCC–NBS descriptor: Pale yellow green
- B: Normalized to [0–255] (byte)

Beige (/beɪʒ/ BAYZH) is variously described as a pale sandy fawn color, a grayish tan, a light-grayish yellowish brown, or a pale to grayish yellow. It takes its name from French, where the word originally meant natural wool that has been neither bleached nor dyed, hence also the color of natural wool.

The word "beige" has come to be used to describe a variety of light tints chosen for their neutral or pale warm appearance.

Beige began to commonly be used as a term for a color in France beginning approximately 1855–1860; the writer Edmond de Goncourt used it in the novel La Fille Elisa in 1877. The first recorded use of beige as a color name in English was in 1887.

Beige is notoriously difficult to produce in traditional offset CMYK printing because of the low levels of inks used on each plate; often it will print in purple or green and vary within a print run.

Beige is also a popular color in clothing, such as for men's trousers, as well as for interior design.

== Various beige colors ==
=== Cosmic latte ===
Cosmic latte

Color coordinates
- Hex triplet: #FFF8E7
- sRGB^{B} (r, g, b): (255, 248, 231)
- HSV (h, s, v): (42°, 9%, 100%)
- CIELCh_{uv} (L, C, h): (98, 15, 70°)
- Source: pha.jhu.edu
- ISCC–NBS descriptor: Pale yellow green
- B: Normalized to [0–255] (byte)

Cosmic latte is a name assigned in 2002 to the average color of the universe (derived from a sampling of the electromagnetic radiation from 200,000 galaxies), given by a team of astronomers from Johns Hopkins University.

=== Cream ===
Cream

Color coordinates
- Hex triplet: #FFFDD0
- sRGB^{B} (r, g, b): (255, 253, 208)
- HSV (h, s, v): (57°, 18%, 100%)
- CIELCh_{uv} (L, C, h): (98, 33, 84°)
- ISCC–NBS descriptor: Light yellow green
- B: Normalized to [0–255] (byte)

Cream is the color of the cream produced by cattle grazing on natural pasture with plants rich in yellow carotenoid pigments, some of which are incorporated into the cream, to give a yellow tone to white. The first recorded use of cream as a color name in English was in 1590.

=== Unbleached silk ===
Unbleached silk

Color coordinates
- Hex triplet: #FFDDCA
- sRGB^{B} (r, g, b): (255, 221, 202)
- HSV (h, s, v): (22°, 21%, 100%)
- CIELCh_{uv} (L, C, h): (90, 29, 40°)
- Source: JTC
- ISCC–NBS descriptor: Pale orange yellow
- B: Normalized to [0–255] (byte)

Unbleached silk is one of the Japanese traditional colors in use since beginning in 660 CE in the form of various dyes that are used in designing kimonos. The name of this color in Japanese is shironeri.

=== Tuscan ===
Tuscan

Color coordinates
- Hex triplet: #FAD6A5
- sRGB^{B} (r, g, b): (250, 214, 165)
- HSV (h, s, v): (35°, 34%, 98%)
- CIELCh_{uv} (L, C, h): (88, 47, 56°)
- Source: ISCC-NBS
- ISCC–NBS descriptor: Light yellow
- B: Normalized to [0–255] (byte)

The first recorded use of Tuscan as a color name in English was in 1887.

=== Buff ===
Buff

Color coordinates
- Hex triplet: #DAA06D
- sRGB^{B} (r, g, b): (218, 160, 109)
- HSV (h, s, v): (28°, 50%, 85%)
- CIELCh_{uv} (L, C, h): (70, 60, 43°)
- ISCC–NBS descriptor: Light yellow
- B: Normalized to [0–255] (byte)

Buff is a pale yellow-brown color that got its name from the color of buffed leather.

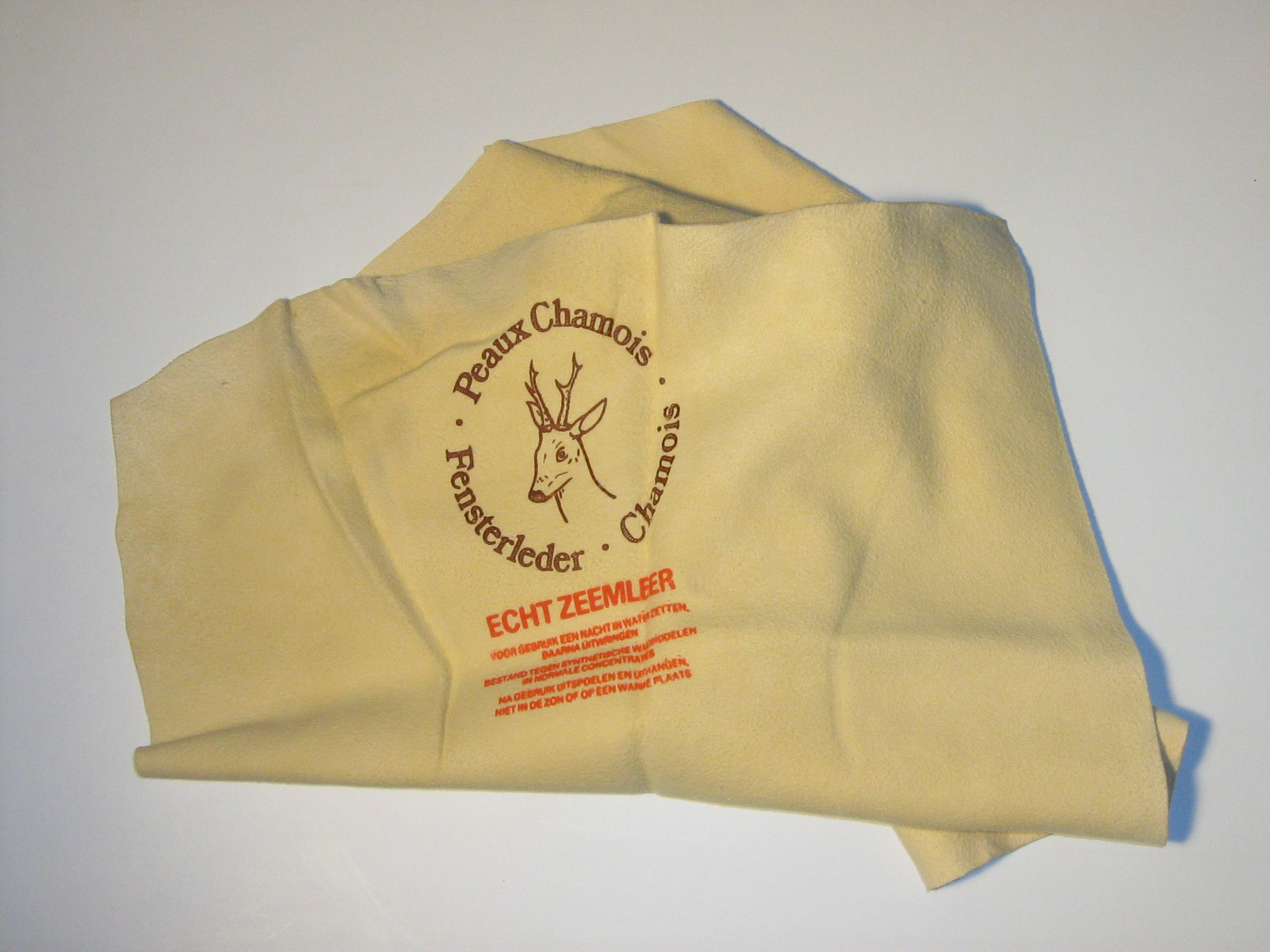
Buff is the color of fine undyed leathers.

According to the Oxford English Dictionary, buff as a descriptor of a color was first used in the London Gazette of 1686, describing a uniform to be "A Red Coat with a Buff-colour'd lining".

=== Desert sand ===
Desert sand

Color coordinates
- Hex triplet: #EDC9AF
- sRGB^{B} (r, g, b): (237, 201, 175)
- HSV (h, s, v): (25°, 26%, 93%)
- CIELCh_{uv} (L, C, h): (83, 34, 44°)
- Source: Crayola
- ISCC–NBS descriptor: Pale orange yellow
- B: Normalized to [0–255] (byte)

The color desert sand may be regarded as a deep shade of beige. It is a pale tint of a color called desert. The color name "desert" was first used in 1920.

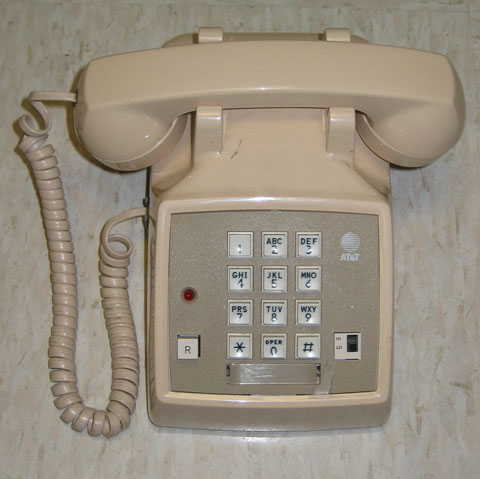
A "beige" AT&T telephone

In the 1960s, the American Telephone & Telegraph Company (AT&T) marketed desert sand–colored telephones for offices and homes. However, they described the color as "beige". It is therefore common for many people to refer to the color desert sand as "beige".

=== Ecru ===
Ecru

Color coordinates
- Hex triplet: #C2B280
- sRGB^{B} (r, g, b): (194, 178, 128)
- HSV (h, s, v): (45°, 34%, 76%)
- CIELCh_{uv} (L, C, h): (73, 39, 71°)
- Source: ISCC-NBS
- ISCC–NBS descriptor: Grayish yellow
- B: Normalized to [0–255] (byte)

Originally in the 19th century and up to at least 1930, the color ecru meant exactly the same color as beige (i.e. the pale cream color shown adjacent as beige), and the word is often used to refer to such fabrics as silk and linen in their unbleached state. Ecru comes from the French word écru, which means literally "raw" or "unbleached".

Since at least the 1950s, however, the color ecru has been regarded as a different color from beige, presumably in order to allow interior designers a wider palette of colors to choose from.

=== Khaki ===
Khaki

Color coordinates
- Hex triplet: #C3B091
- sRGB^{B} (r, g, b): (195, 176, 145)
- HSV (h, s, v): (37°, 26%, 76%)
- CIELCh_{uv} (L, C, h): (73, 28, 61°)
- Source: HTML/CSS
- ISCC–NBS descriptor: Grayish yellow
- B: Normalized to [0–255] (byte)

Khaki was designated in the 1930 book A Dictionary of Color, the standard for color nomenclature before the introduction of computers.

The first recorded use of khaki as a color name in English was in 1848.

=== French beige ===
French beige

Color coordinates
- Hex triplet: #A67B5B
- sRGB^{B} (r, g, b): (166, 123, 91)
- HSV (h, s, v): (26°, 45%, 65%)
- CIELCh_{uv} (L, C, h): (55, 41, 41°)
- Source: ISCC-NBS
- ISCC–NBS descriptor: Light brown
- B: Normalized to [0–255] (byte)

Light French beige

Color coordinates
- Hex triplet: #C8AD7F
- sRGB^{B} (r, g, b): (200, 173, 127)
- HSV (h, s, v): (38°, 36%, 78%)
- CIELCh_{uv} (L, C, h): (72, 41, 60°)
- Source: Pourpre.com
- ISCC–NBS descriptor: Grayish yellow
- B: Normalized to [0–255] (byte)

The first recorded use of French beige as a color name in English was in 1927.

The normalized color coordinates for French beige are identical to café au lait and Tuscan tan, which were first recorded as color names in English in 1839 and 1926, respectively.

=== Mode beige ===
Mode beige

Color coordinates
- Hex triplet: #967117
- sRGB^{B} (r, g, b): (150, 113, 23)
- HSV (h, s, v): (43°, 85%, 59%)
- CIELCh_{uv} (L, C, h): (50, 58, 58°)
- Source: ISCC-NBS
- ISCC–NBS descriptor: Light olive brown
- B: Normalized to [0–255] (byte)

Mode beige is a very dark shade of beige.

The first recorded use of mode beige as a color name in English was in 1928.

The normalized color coordinates for mode beige are identical to the color names drab, sand dune, and bistre brown, which were first recorded as color names in English, respectively, in 1686, 1925, and 1930.

== In nature ==
Fish

- Beige catshark

Mammal

- Beige rabbit

== In culture ==
=== Personal computers ===
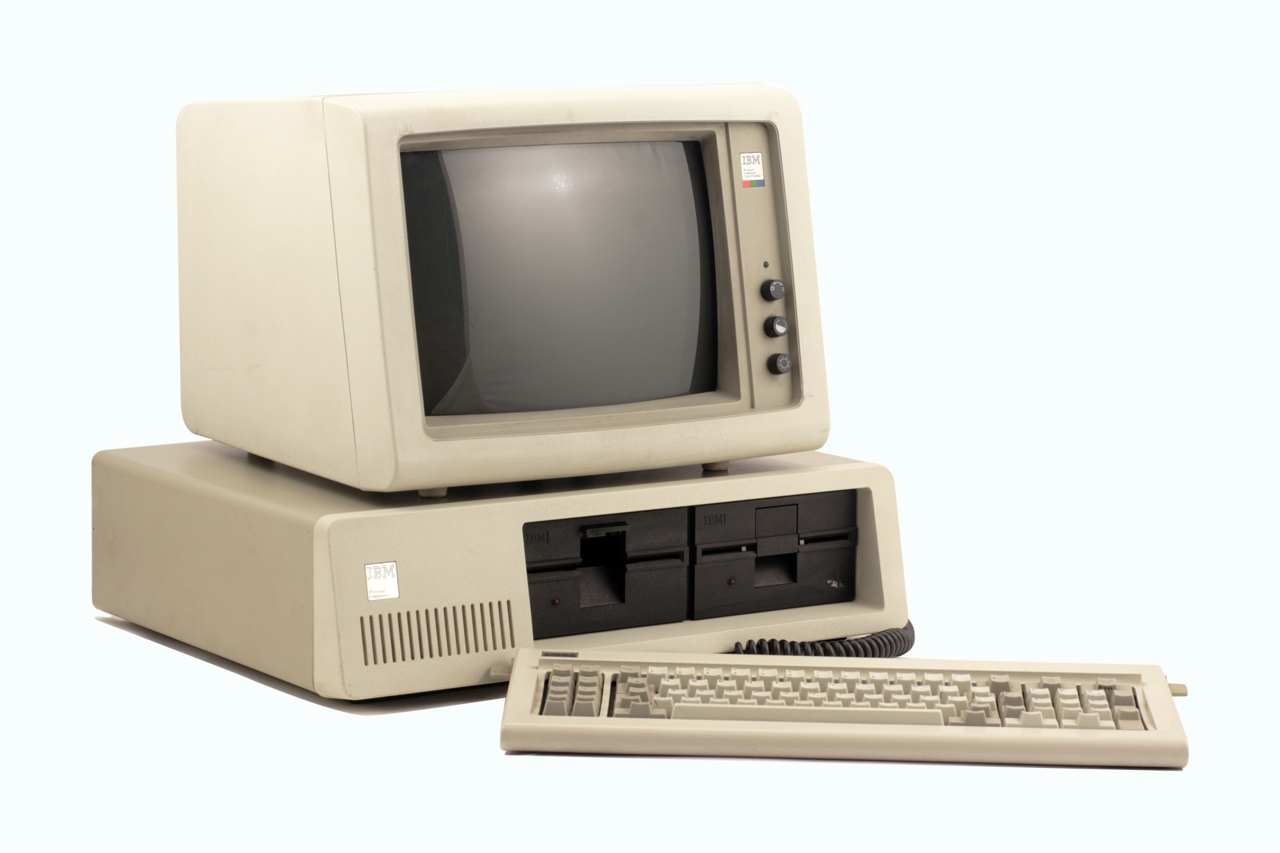
A beige IBM 5150 personal computer

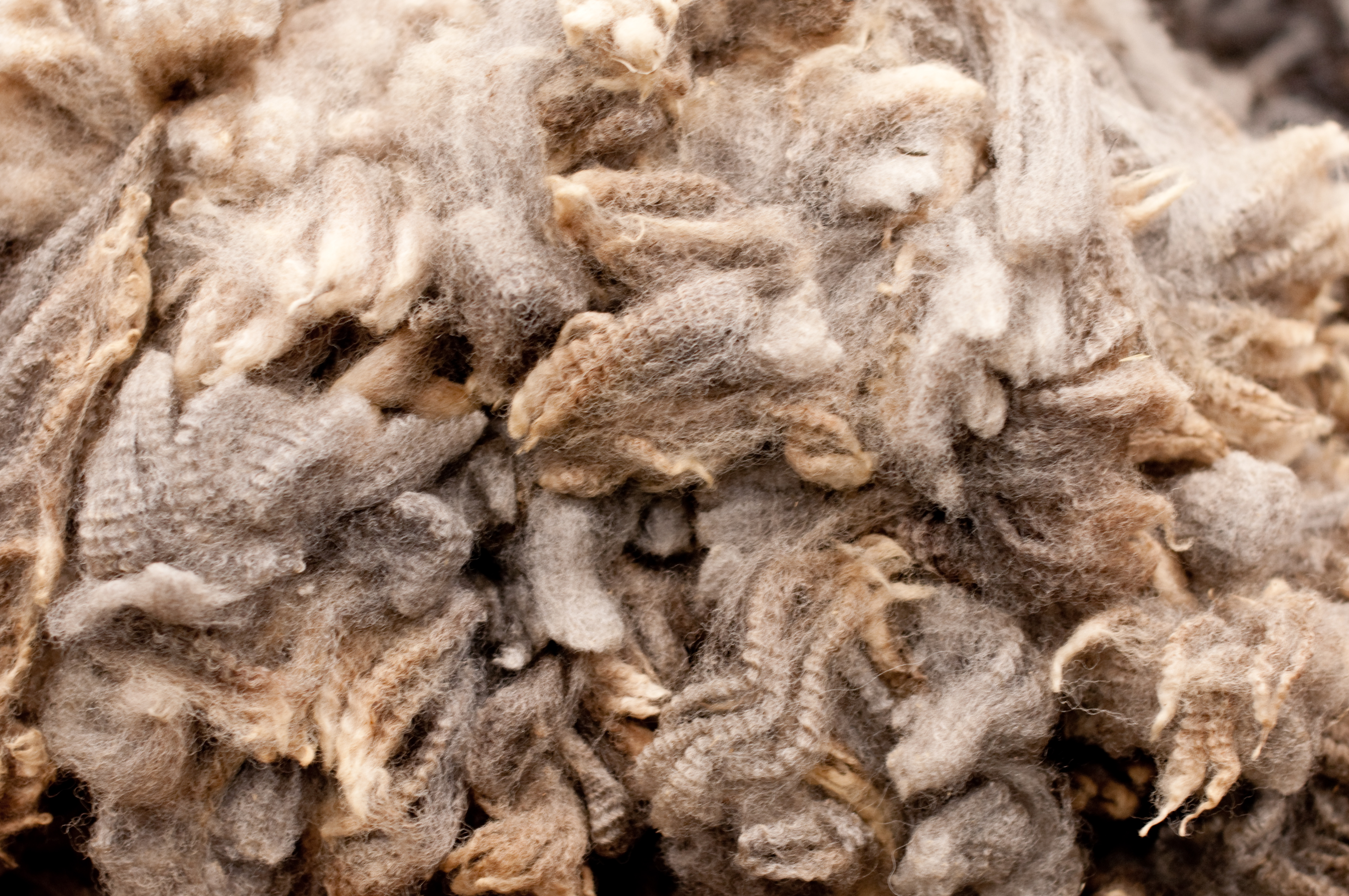
Beige is the French word for the color of natural wool (freshly shorn example at the Royal Winter Fair).

In the 1970s, 1980s, and early 1990s, personal computers and other office electronics were often colored beige. The trend began in Germany, where workplaces commonly required beige- or gray-colored equipment, and later spread worldwide. Beige's popularity was superseded by black starting in the 1990s, with the release of black computers like the IBM ThinkPad.

=== Metaphor ===
Beige is sometimes used as a metaphor for something that is bland, boring, conventional, or even sad. In this sense, it is used in contradistinction to more vibrant and exciting (or more individual) colors.

== See also ==
- Beige Book
- The Beige Room
- Drab (color)
- Lists of colors
- RAL 1001 Beige
- Shades of white
