= Venetian red =

Pigment

Color coordinates
- Hex triplet: #C80815
- sRGB^{B} (r, g, b): (200, 8, 21)
- HSV (h, s, v): (356°, 96%, 78%)
- CIELCh_{uv} (L, C, h): (42, 136, 12°)
- Source: ColorHexa
- ISCC–NBS descriptor: Vivid red
- B: Normalized to [0–255] (byte)

Venetian red is a light and warm (somewhat unsaturated) pigment that is a darker shade of red. The composition of Venetian red changed over time. Originally it consisted of natural ferric oxide (Fe_{2}O_{3}, partially hydrated) obtained from the red hematite. Modern versions are frequently made with synthetic red iron oxide produced via calcination of green vitriol (a.k.a. copperas) mixed with white chalk. The pigment contains up to 50% of the ferric oxide.

Historically, Venetian red was a red earth color often used in Italian Renaissance paintings. It was also called sinopia because the best-quality pigment came from the port of Sinop in northern Turkey. It was the major ingredient in the pigment called cinabrese, described by the 15th-century Italian painter and writer Cennino Cennini in his handbook on painting, Il libro dell'arte. Cennini recommended mixing Venetian red with lime white, in proportions of two to one, to paint the skin tones of faces, hands and nudes.

The first recorded use of Venetian red as a color name in English was in 1753. There are many other names for the iron oxide red pigments of different shades, with Spanish red being very similar.

== Sources ==
- Eastaugh, Nicholas (2008). "Venetian red". Pigment Compendium: A Dictionary and Optical Microscopy of Historical Pigments. Routledge. p. 389. ISBN 978-0-7506-8980-9.
- Gettens, R. J.; Stout, G. L. (1966). "Venetian Red". Painting Materials: A Short Encyclopedia. Courier Corporation. p. 169. ISBN 978-0-486-14242-5. OCLC 868969354.
