= Iron oxide red =

Reddish pigment

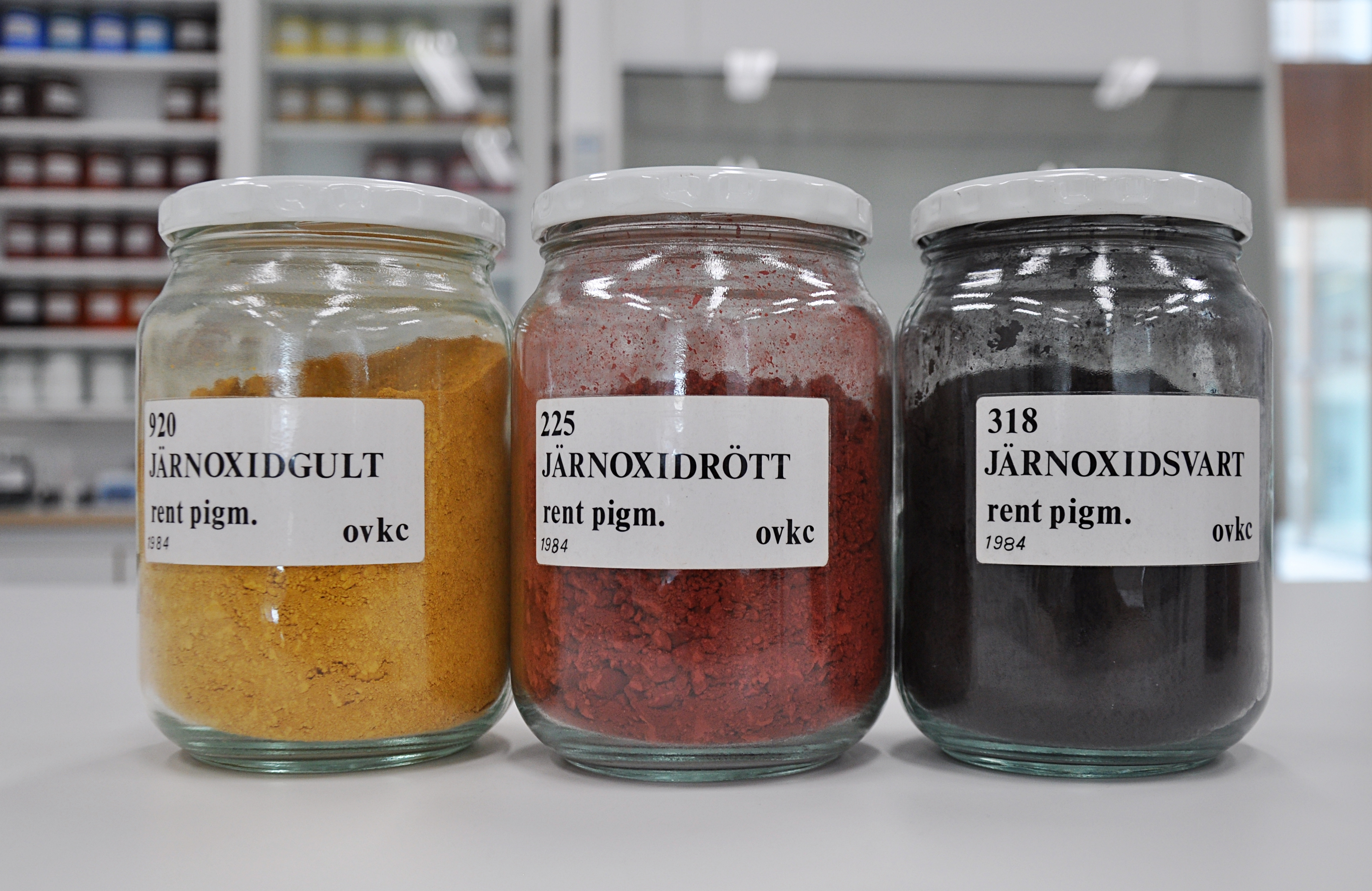
Iron oxide pigments in jars: yellow, red, brown

Iron oxide red is a generic name of a ferric oxide pigment of reddish colors. Multiple shades based on both anhydrous Fe_{2}O_{3} and its hydrates were known to painters since prehistory. The pigments were originally obtained from natural sources, since the 20th century they are mostly synthetic. These substances form one of the most commercially important groups of pigments, and their names sometimes reflect the location of a natural source, later transferred to the synthetic analog. Well-known examples include the Persian Gulf Oxide with 75% Fe_{2}O_{3} and 25% silica, Spanish red with 85% of oxide, Tuscan red. Other shades of iron oxides include Venetian Red, English Red, and Kobe.

== Properties ==
The anhydrous pigment has a dark purple-red or maroon color, hydrates' colors vary from dull yellow (yellow ochre) to warm red.

The iron oxide red is extremely stable: it is not affected by light and most chemicals (soluble in hot concentrated acids); heat only affects the hydrated variants (the water is removed, and the color darkens).

== Indian red ==
Indian Red

Color coordinates
- Hex triplet: #CD5C5C
- sRGB^{B} (r, g, b): (205, 92, 92)
- HSV (h, s, v): (0°, 55%, 80%)
- CIELCh_{uv} (L, C, h): (53, 85, 12°)
- Source: X11
- ISCC–NBS descriptor: Moderate red
- B: Normalized to [0–255] (byte)

Indian red is a pigment, a variety of ocher, which gets its color from ferric oxide, used to be sourced in India, now made artificially.

=== Etymology ===
The name Indian red derives from this pigment being originally imported from India, where red laterite soil is found, composed of naturally occurring iron oxides. The first recorded use of Indian red as a color term in English was in 1672.

=== Deep Indian red ===
Deep Indian Red

Color coordinates
- Hex triplet: #B94E48
- sRGB^{B} (r, g, b): (185, 78, 72)
- HSV (h, s, v): (3°, 61%, 73%)
- CIELCh_{uv} (L, C, h): (47, 83, 14°)
- Source: Crayola
- ISCC–NBS descriptor: Dark reddish orange
- B: Normalized to [0–255] (byte)

Deep Indian red is the color originally called Indian red from its formulation in 1903 until 1999, but now called chestnut, in Crayola crayons. This color was also produced in a special limited edition in which it was called Vermont maple syrup.

At the request of educators worried that children (mistakenly; see Etymology) believed the name represented the skin color of Native Americans, Crayola changed the name of their crayon color Indian Red to Chestnut in 1999.

=== Indian red in culture ===
Railroads/Railways

- The Talyllyn Railway painted their locomotives Talyllyn and Dolgoch Indian Red in honour of the 150th anniversary of the line in 2015.
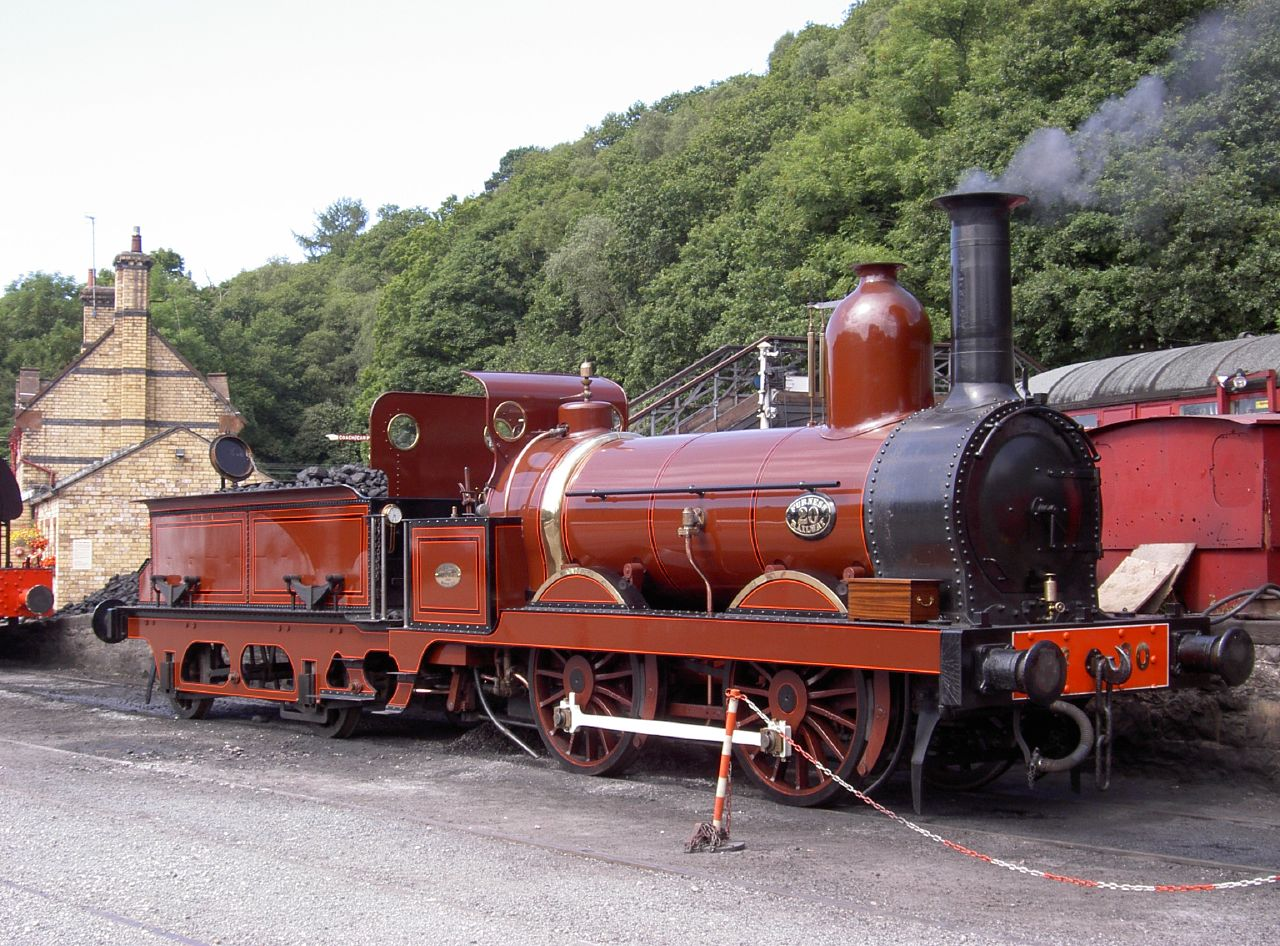
  Furness Railway Nº20, as restored today
- The Furness Railway in the UK used Indian Red for its locomotive livery.
- The Department of Railways New South Wales, Public Transport Commission and the State Rail Authority painted their diesel locos and passengers cars in Indian red.

== Venetian red ==
Venetian Red

Color coordinates
- Hex triplet: #C80815
- sRGB^{B} (r, g, b): (200, 8, 21)
- HSV (h, s, v): (356°, 96%, 78%)
- CIELCh_{uv} (L, C, h): (42, 136, 12°)
- Source: halfords.com
- ISCC–NBS descriptor: Vivid red
- B: Normalized to [0–255] (byte)

At right is displayed the color Venetian red.

Venetian red is a light and warm (somewhat unsaturated) pigment that is a darker shade of scarlet, derived from nearly pure ferric oxide (Fe_{2}O_{3}) of the hematite type. Modern versions are frequently made with synthetic red iron oxide.

The first recorded use of Venetian red as a color name in English was in 1753.

== English red ==
English Red

Color coordinates
- Hex triplet: #AB4E52
- sRGB^{B} (r, g, b): (171, 78, 82)
- HSV (h, s, v): (357°, 54%, 67%)
- CIELCh_{uv} (L, C, h): (45, 67, 10°)
- Source: ISCC-NBS
- ISCC–NBS descriptor: Moderate red
- B: Normalized to [0–255] (byte)

At right is displayed the color English red.

This red is a tone of Indian red, made like Indian red with pigment made from iron oxide.

The first recorded use of English red as a color name in English was in the 1700s (exact year uncertain). In the Encyclopédie of Denis Diderot in 1765, alternate names for Indian red included "what one also calls, however improperly, English Red."

== Kobe ==
Kobe

Color coordinates
- Hex triplet: #882D17
- sRGB^{B} (r, g, b): (136, 45, 23)
- HSV (h, s, v): (12°, 83%, 53%)
- CIELCh_{uv} (L, C, h): (32, 73, 18°)
- Source: ISCC-NBS
- ISCC–NBS descriptor: Strong reddish brown
- B: Normalized to [0–255] (byte)

At right is displayed color kobe.

The color kobe is a dark tone of Indian red, made like Indian red from iron oxide pigment.

The first recorded use of Kobe as a color name in English was in 1924.

The normalized color coordinates for Kobe are identical to sienna, first recorded as a color name in English in 1760.

== See also ==
- Chestnut (color)
- Rust (color)
- List of colors

== Sources ==
- Gettens, R. J.; Stout, G. L. (1966a). "Indian Red". Painting Materials: A Short Encyclopedia. Courier Corporation. p. 119. ISBN 978-0-486-14242-5. OCLC 868969354.
- Gettens, R. J.; Stout, G. L. (1966b). "Iron Oxide Red". Painting Materials: A Short Encyclopedia. Courier Corporation. p. 122. ISBN 978-0-486-14242-5. OCLC 868969354.
