= Coffee (color) =

Brownish color of a roasted coffee bean

Color coordinates
- Hex triplet: #6F4E37
- sRGB^{B} (r, g, b): (111, 78, 55)
- HSV (h, s, v): (25°, 50%, 44%)
- CIELCh_{uv} (L, C, h): (36, 30, 39°)
- Source: ISCC-NBS
- ISCC–NBS descriptor: Moderate brown
- B: Normalized to [0–255] (byte)

Coffee is a brownish color that is a representation of a roasted coffee bean. Different types of coffee beans have different colors when roasted—the color coffee represents an average.

The first recorded use of coffee as a color name in English was in 1695.

The normalized color coordinates for coffee are identical to Tuscan brown, which was first recorded as a color name in English in 1913.

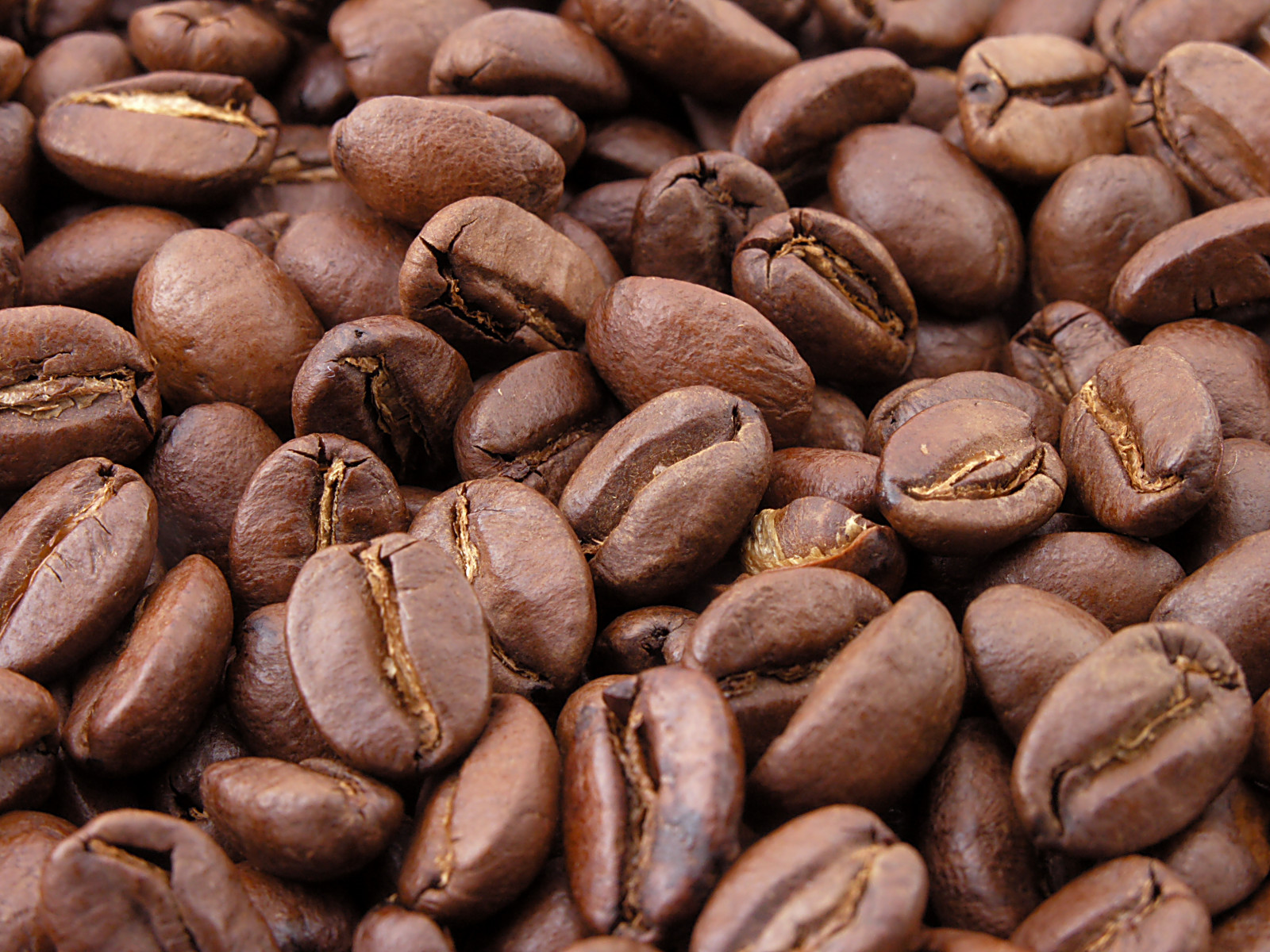
Roasted coffee beans

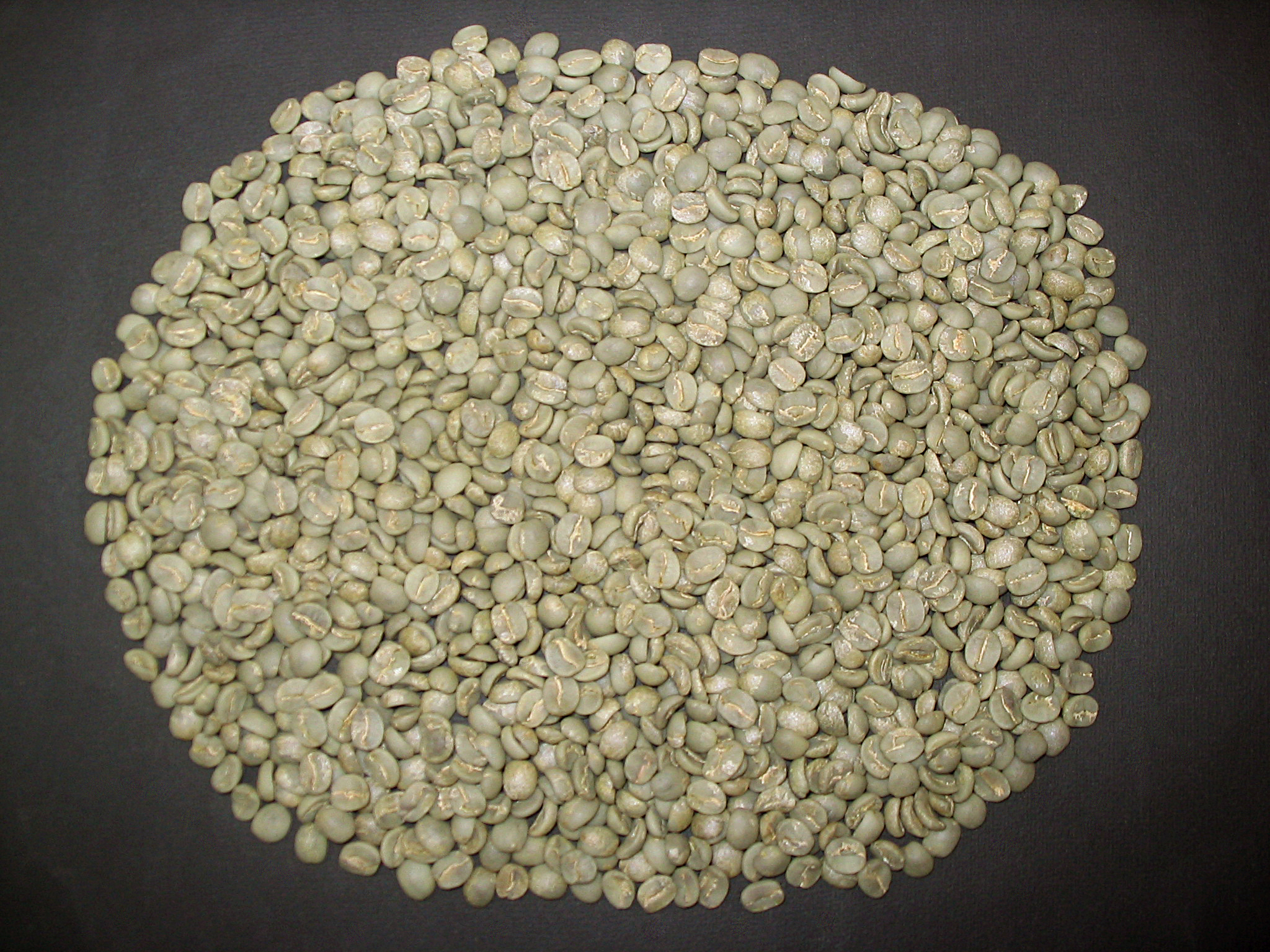
'Green' coffee beans before roasting

== Variations of coffee ==
=== Café au Lait ===
Café au Lait

Color coordinates
- Hex triplet: #A67B5B
- sRGB^{B} (r, g, b): (166, 123, 91)
- HSV (h, s, v): (26°, 45%, 65%)
- CIELCh_{uv} (L, C, h): (55, 41, 41°)
- Source: ISCC-NBS
- ISCC–NBS descriptor: Light brown
- B: Normalized to [0–255] (byte)

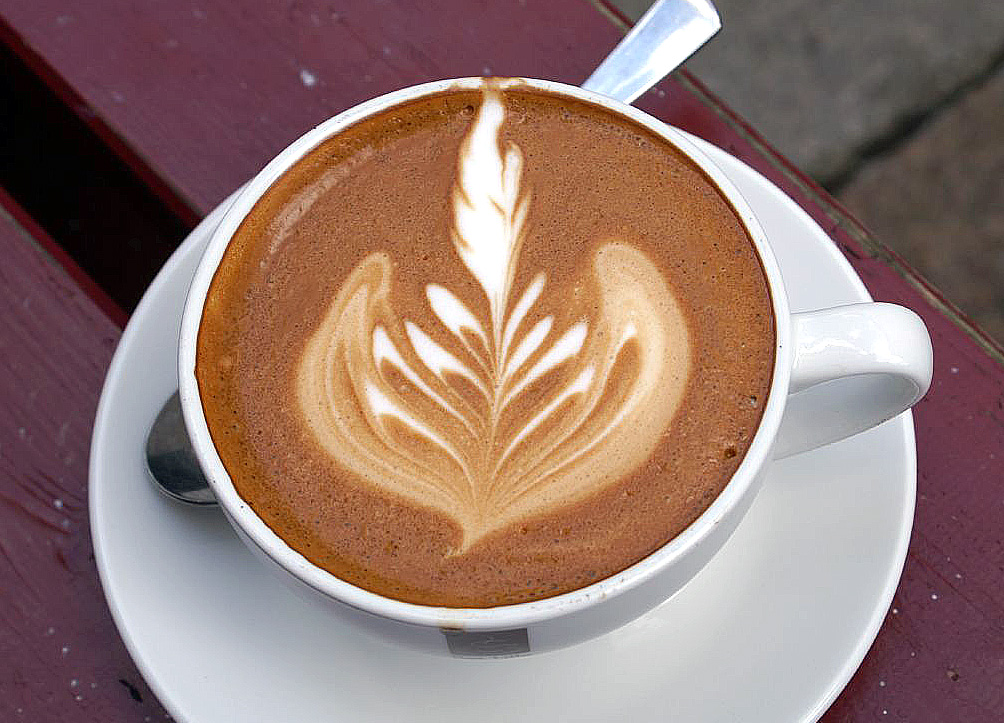
Coffee with milk (a latte)

The color displayed at right is café au lait, also known as coffee and milk or latte. This is a representation of the color of coffee mixed with milk, which when prepared commercially by a barista in a coffee shop is known as a latte.

The first recorded use of cafe au lait as a color name in English was in 1839.

The normalized color coordinates for café au lait are identical to Tuscan tan and French beige, which were first recorded as color names in English in 1926 and 1927, respectively.

=== Café Noir ===
Café Noir

Color coordinates
- Hex triplet: #4B3621
- sRGB^{B} (r, g, b): (75, 54, 33)
- HSV (h, s, v): (30°, 56%, 29%)
- CIELCh_{uv} (L, C, h): (24, 20, 46°)
- Source: ISCC-NBS
- ISCC–NBS descriptor: Dark yellowish brown
- B: Normalized to [0–255] (byte)

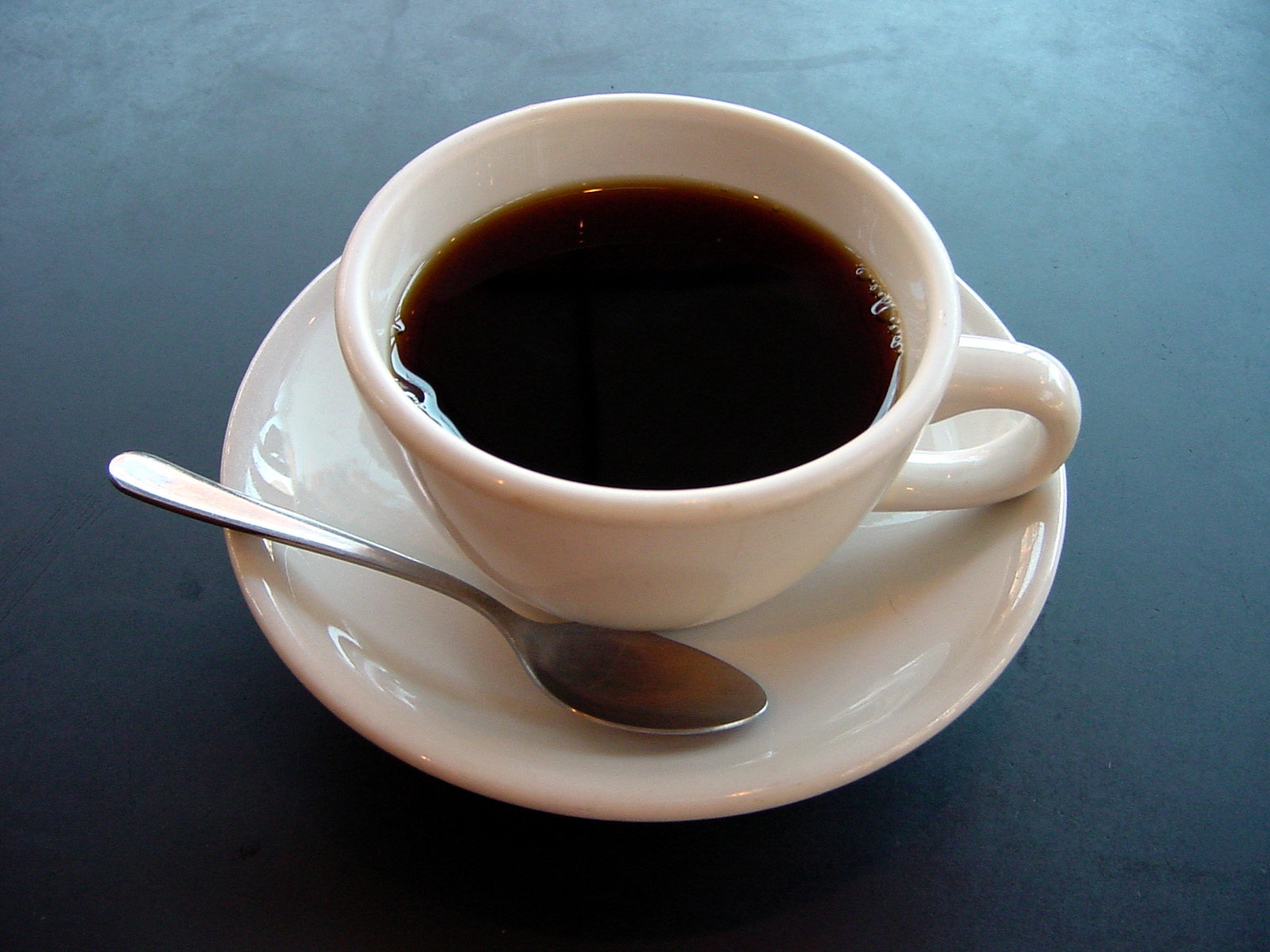
A cup of black coffee

The color displayed at right is café noir, also known as black coffee. It is a representation of the color of brewed black coffee.

The first recorded use of cafe noir as a color name in English was in 1928.

== See also ==
- List of colors
