= Earth pigment =

Naturally occurring minerals used as pigments

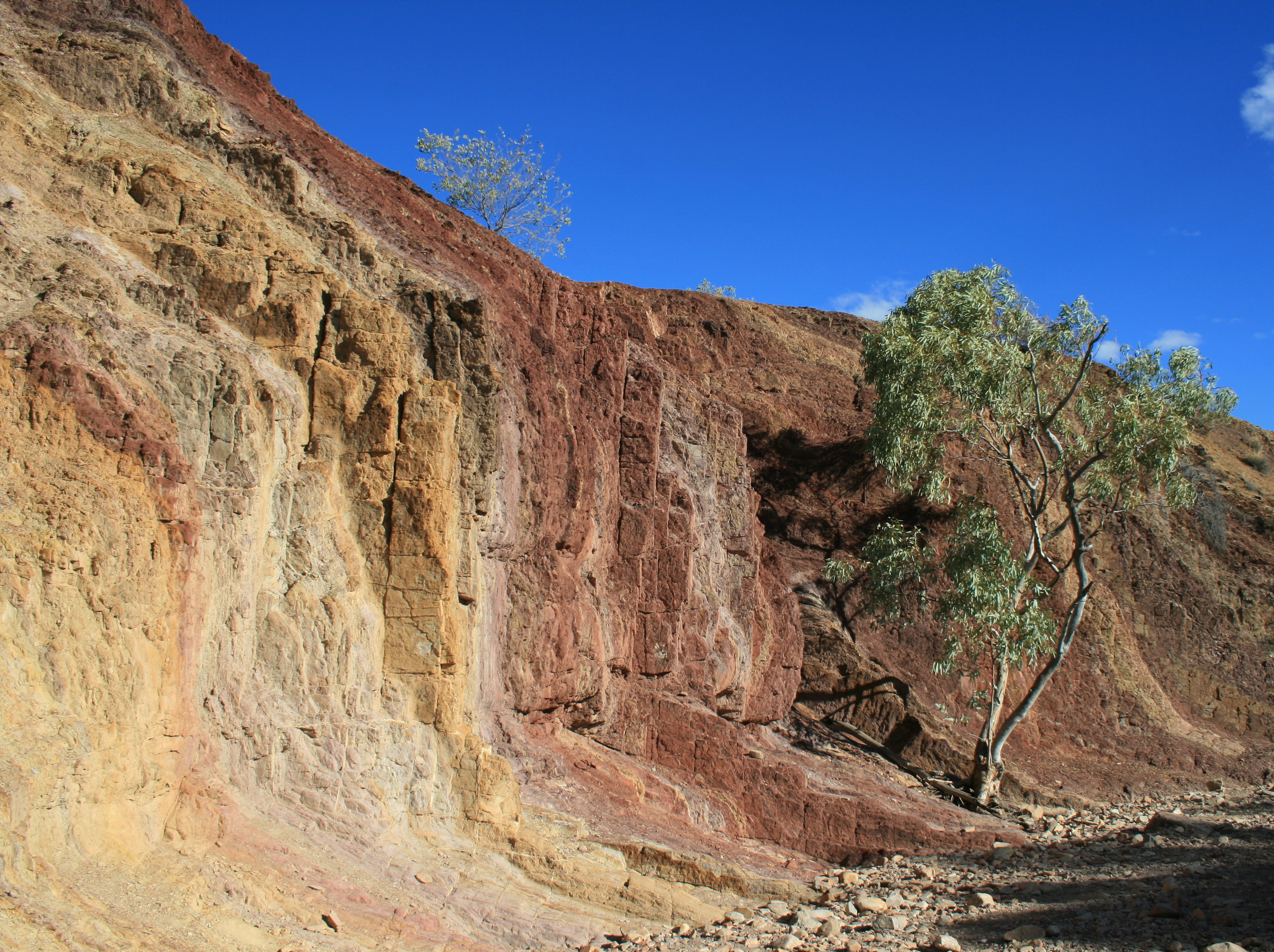
A range of pigments were mined by Indigenous Australians at this Ochre Pit in central Australia.

Earth pigments are naturally occurring minerals that have been used since prehistoric times as pigments. Among the primary types of earth pigments include the reddish-brown ochres, siennas, and umbers, which contain various amounts of iron oxides and manganese oxides. Other earth pigments include the green earth pigments or terres vertes, blue earth pigments such as vivianite-based "blue ochre", white earth pigments such as chalk, and black earth pigments such as charcoal.

Earth pigments are known for their fast drying time in oil painting, relative inexpensiveness, and lightfastness. Cave paintings done in sienna still survive today.

== Production ==
After mining, the mineral used for making a pigment is ground to a very fine powder (if not already in the form of clay), washed to remove water-soluble components, dried, and ground again to powder. For some pigments, notably sienna and umber, the color can be deepened by heating (calcination) in a process known as "burning", although it does not involve oxidation but instead dehydration.

== See also ==
- Otjize
