= Tuscan red =

Shade of red used on some railway cars

Tuscan Red

Color coordinates
- Hex triplet: #7C3030
- sRGB^{B} (r, g, b): (124, 48, 48)
- HSV (h, s, v): (0°, 61%, 49%)
- CIELCh_{uv} (L, C, h): (31, 55, 12°)
- Source: Maerz and Paul
- ISCC–NBS descriptor: Dark red
- B: Normalized to [0–255] (byte)

Tuscan red is a shade of red that was used on some railroad cars, particularly passenger cars.

The color is most closely associated with the Pennsylvania Railroad, which used it on passenger cars and on its TrucTrain flatcars. It also was used extensively by the New South Wales Government Railways in Australia, in a similar fashion to the PRR. The Norfolk and Western Railway used it as an accent color on its J class steam locomotives. The Canadian Pacific Railway used it historically and painted its luxury revival cars in this color. It is also a Prismacolor colored pencil.

== History ==
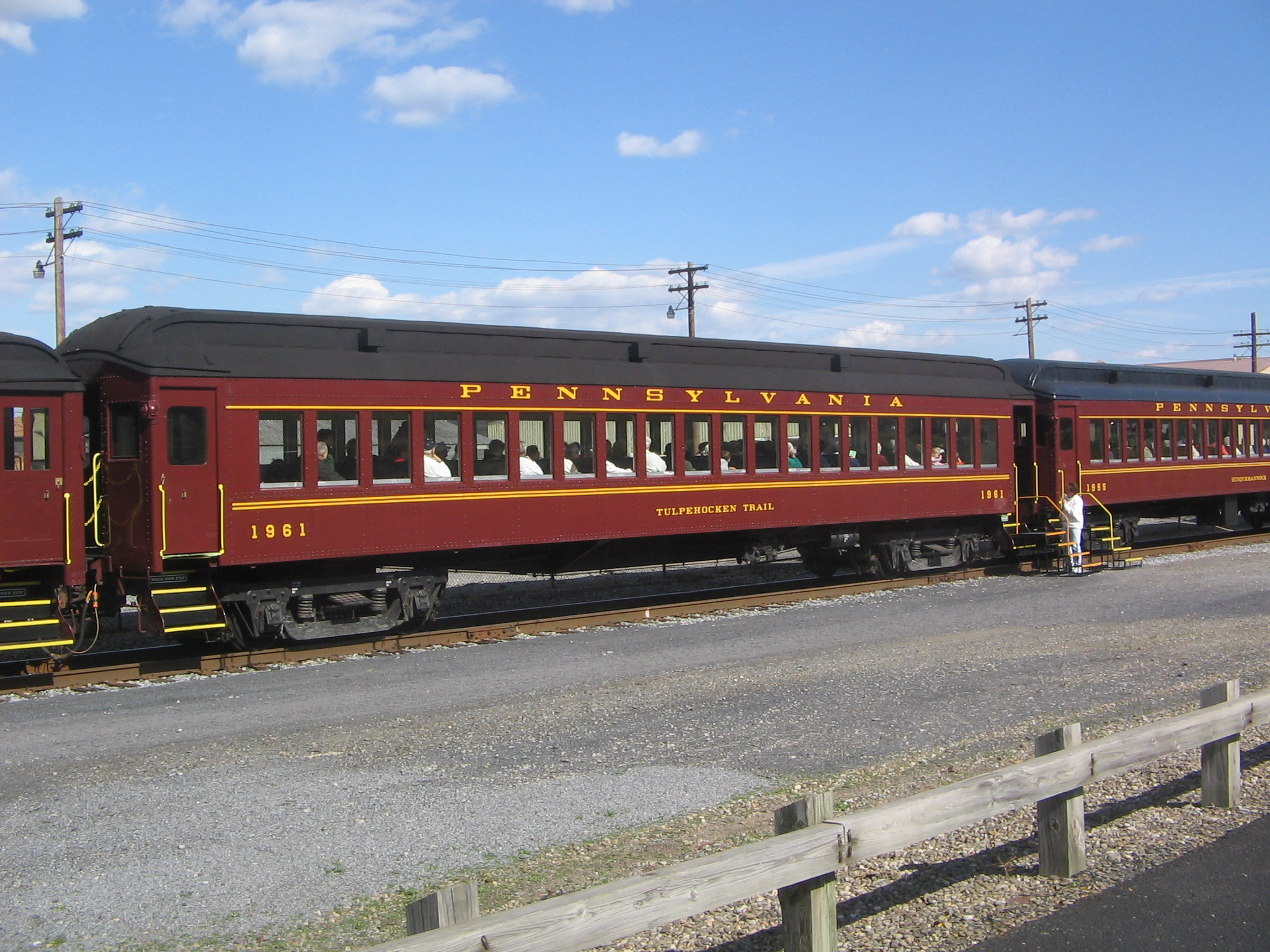
Tuscan red was the signature color of the Pennsylvania Railroad

The first recorded use of Tuscan red as a color name in English was in the early 1800s (exact date uncertain).

The color was popular in the late 19th century but non-standardized. The Pennsylvania Railroad adopted dark red passenger car paint in the 1870s, in part because the darker color masked soot from bituminous coal smoke better than the lighter finishes. By the 1880s, the railroad had standardized a rich maroon known as ‘Tuscan red’, which later became the signature color for their passenger equipment and diesel locomotives. Before the 1880s, pigments extracted from brazilwood were used in its manufacture, but these proved inadequate in terms of hiding power and stability.

A 1917 US National Bureau of Standards circular describes it as based on Indian red, a variety of iron oxide red. The color was then modified by treatment with an alizarin lake pigment. The pigment's stability lent itself to hard use in applications such as rail cars, steam pipes, radiators, and machinery. Lower-cost imitations were made without iron oxides by using gypsum or whiting as a base and adding aniline dyes.

== Variations ==
The traditional color Tuscan red is shown above. The lighter tones of Tuscan red tend toward tan and beige. The darker tones of Tuscan red tend toward purplish tones. These purplish tones of Tuscan red are exemplified by the color deep Tuscan red, shown below.

=== Tuscan ===
Tuscan

Color coordinates
- Hex triplet: #FAD6A5
- sRGB^{B} (r, g, b): (250, 214, 165)
- HSV (h, s, v): (35°, 34%, 98%)
- CIELCh_{uv} (L, C, h): (88, 47, 56°)
- Source: ISCC-NBS
- ISCC–NBS descriptor: Light yellow
- B: Normalized to [0–255] (byte)

Displayed at right is the color Tuscan.

The first recorded use of Tuscan as a color name in English was in 1887.

=== Tuscany ===
Tuscany

Color coordinates
- Hex triplet: #C09999
- sRGB^{B} (r, g, b): (192, 153, 153)
- HSV (h, s, v): (0°, 20%, 75%)
- CIELCh_{uv} (L, C, h): (67, 25, 12°)
- Source: Pantone TPX
- ISCC–NBS descriptor: Light grayish red
- B: Normalized to [0–255] (byte)

The color Tuscany is displayed at right.

The first recorded use of Tuscany as a color name in English was in 1922.

The source of this color is the "Pantone Textile Paper eXtended (TPX)" color list, color #16-1219 TPX—Tuscany.

=== Tuscan tan ===
Tuscan Tan

Color coordinates
- Hex triplet: #A67B5B
- sRGB^{B} (r, g, b): (166, 123, 91)
- HSV (h, s, v): (26°, 45%, 65%)
- CIELCh_{uv} (L, C, h): (55, 41, 41°)
- Source: ISCC-NBS
- ISCC–NBS descriptor: Light brown
- B: Normalized to [0–255] (byte)

Displayed at right is the color Tuscan tan.

The first recorded use of Tuscan tan as a color name in English was in 1926.

The normalized color coordinates for Tuscan tan are identical to café au lait and French beige, which were first recorded as color names in English in 1839 and 1927, respectively.

=== Tuscan brown ===
Tuscan Brown

Color coordinates
- Hex triplet: #6F4E37
- sRGB^{B} (r, g, b): (111, 78, 55)
- HSV (h, s, v): (25°, 50%, 44%)
- CIELCh_{uv} (L, C, h): (36, 30, 39°)
- Source: ISCC-NBS
- ISCC–NBS descriptor: Moderate brown
- B: Normalized to [0–255] (byte)

Displayed at right is the color Tuscan brown.

The first recorded use of Tuscan brown as a color name in English was in 1913.

The normalized color coordinates for Tuscan brown are identical to coffee, which was first recorded as a color name in English in 1695.

=== Medium Tuscan red ===
Medium Tuscan Red

Color coordinates
- Hex triplet: #79443B
- sRGB^{B} (r, g, b): (121, 68, 59)
- HSV (h, s, v): (9°, 51%, 47%)
- CIELCh_{uv} (L, C, h): (35, 39, 20°)
- Source: ISCC-NBS
- ISCC–NBS descriptor: Moderate reddish brown
- B: Normalized to [0–255] (byte)

Medium Tuscan red is that tone of Tuscan red that is called Tuscan red in the ISCC-NBS color list.

== See also ==
- List of colors
