= Umber =

Earth pigment

Color coordinates
- Hex triplet: #635147
- sRGB^{B} (r, g, b): (99, 81, 71)
- HSV (h, s, v): (21°, 28%, 39%)
- CIELCh_{uv} (L, C, h): (36, 15, 39°)
- Source: ColorHexa
- B: Normalized to [0–255] (byte)

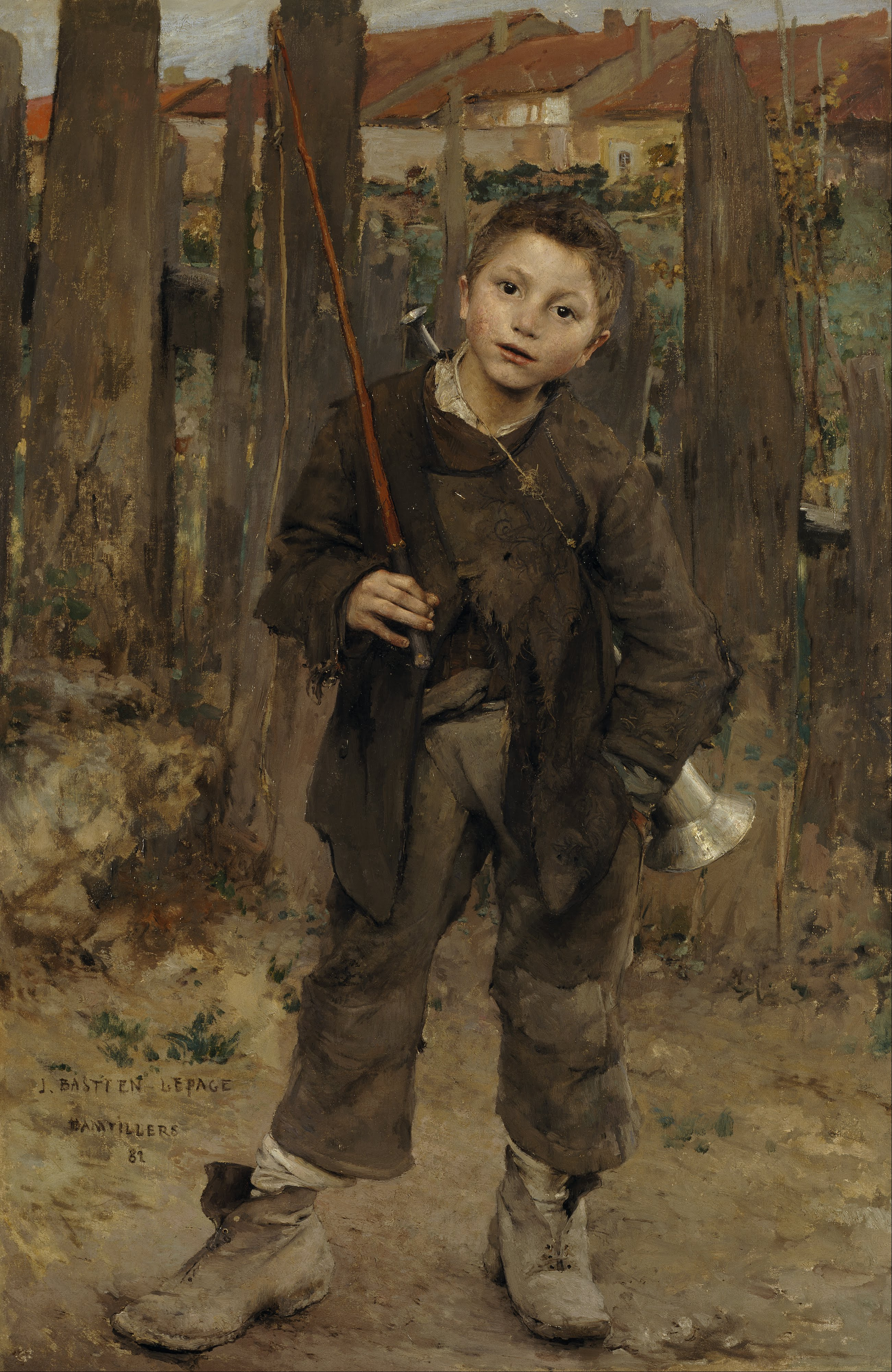
Jules Bastien-Lepage, Pas Meche, 1882. An example of the shadows created by using umber in a painting.

Umber is a natural earth pigment consisting of iron oxide and manganese oxide; it has a brownish color that can vary among shades of yellow, red, and green. Umber is considered one of the oldest pigments known to humans. Umber's advantages are its highly versatile color, warm tone, and quick drying abilities. While some sources indicate that umber's name comes from its geographic origin in Umbria, other scholars suggest that it derives from the Latin word umbra, which means "shadow". The belief that its name derives from the word for shadow is fitting, as the color helps create shadows. The color is primarily produced in Cyprus. Umber is typically mined from open pits or underground mines and ground into a fine powder that is washed to remove impurities. In the 20th century, the rise of synthetic dyes decreased the demand for natural pigments such as umber.

== History ==
Ocher, a family of earth pigments which includes umber, has been identified in the caves of Altamira in Spain and the Lascaux Cave in France. Some sources indicate that umber was not frequently used in medieval art because of its emphasis on bright and vivid colors. Other sources indicate, however, that umber was used in the Middle Ages to create different shades of brown, most often seen for skin tones. Umber's use in Europe increased in the late 15th century. Umber became more popular during the Renaissance when its versatility, earthy appearance, availability, and inexpensiveness were recognized.

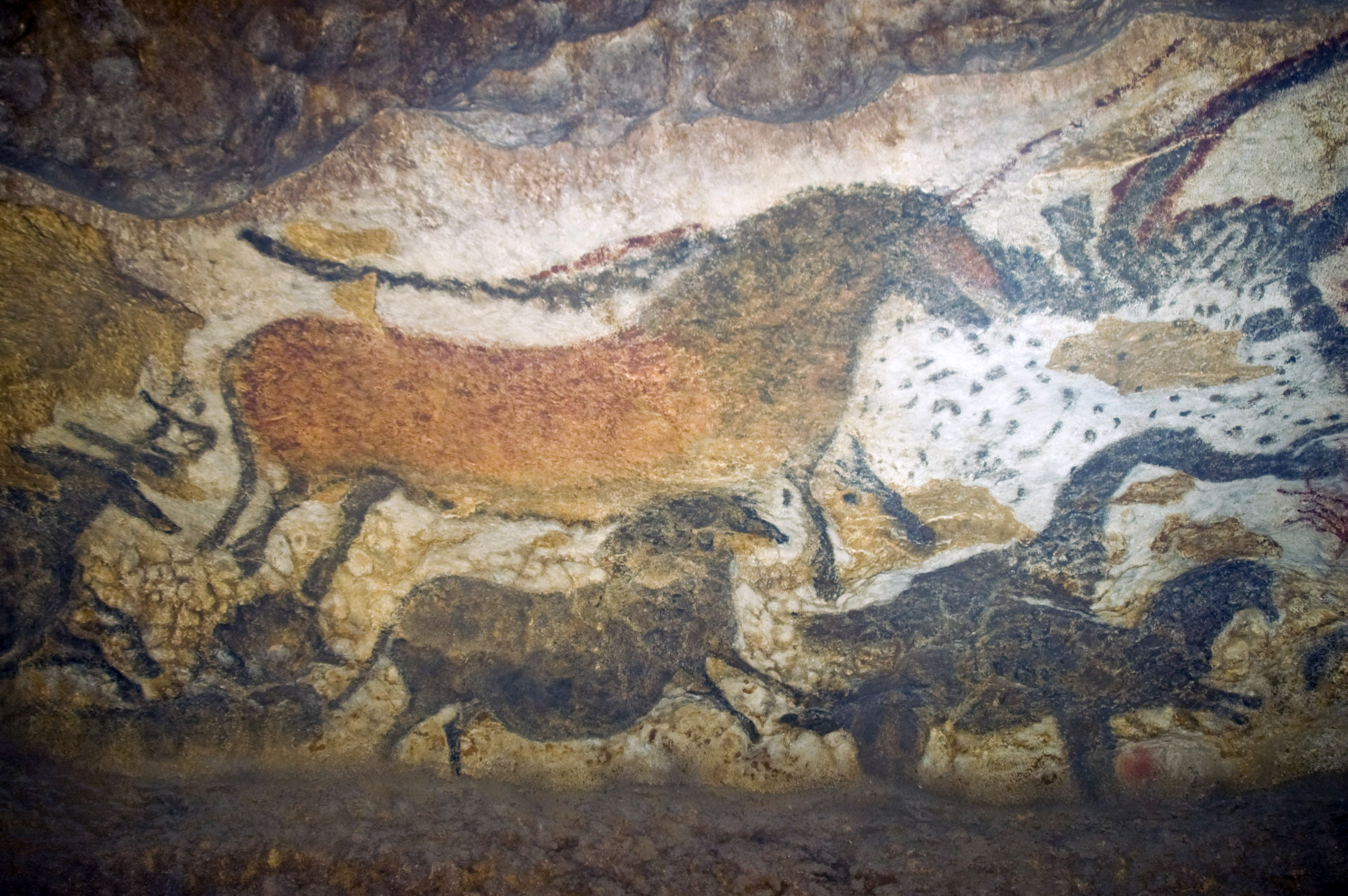
Reproduction of Lascaux cave paintings, which are around 17,000 years old.

Umber gained widespread popularity in Dutch landscape painting in the eighteenth century. Artists recognized the value of umber's high stability, inertness, and drying abilities. It became a standard color within eighteenth-century palettes throughout Europe. Umber's popularity grew during the Baroque period with the rise of the chiaroscuro style. Umber allowed painters to create an intense light and dark contrast. Underpainting was another popular technique for painting that used umber as a base color. Umber was valuable in deploying this technique, creating a range of earth like tones with various layering of color.

Toward the end of the 19th century, the Impressionist movement started to use cheaper and more readily available synthetic dyes and reject natural pigments like umber to create mixed hues of brown. The Impressionists chose to make their own browns from mixtures of red, yellow, green, blue and other pigments, particularly the new synthetic pigments such as cobalt blue and emerald green that had just been introduced. In the 20th century, natural umber pigments began to be replaced by pigments made with synthetic iron oxide and manganese oxide.

== Criticism ==
Beginning in the 17th century, umber was increasingly criticized within the art community. British painter Edward Norgate, prominent with British royalty and aristocracy, called umber "a foul and greasy color." In the 18th century, Spanish painter Antonio Palomino called umber "very false." Jan Blockx, a Belgian painter, opined, "umber should not appear on the palette of the conscientious painter."

== Visual properties ==
Umber is a natural brown pigment extracted from clay containing iron, manganese, and hydroxides. Umber has diverse hues, ranging from yellow-brown to reddish-brown and even green-brown. The color shade varies depending on the proportions of the components. When heated, umber becomes a more intense color and can look almost black. Burnt umber is produced by calcining the raw version. The raw form of umber is typically used for ceramics because it is less expensive.

These warm and earthy tones make it a valuable and versatile pigment for oil painting and other artwork. Umber's high opacity and reactivity of light allow the pigment to have strong hiding power. It is insoluble in water, resistant to alkalis and weak acids, and non-reactive with cement, solvents, oils, and most resins. Umber is known for its stability.

Pigment samples
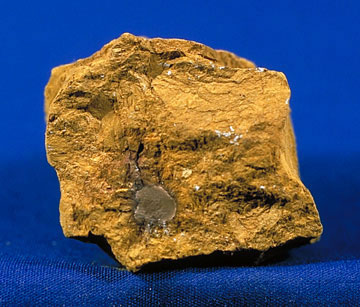
Limonite, or hydrated iron oxide, is the basic ingredient of the earth pigments ochre, sienna and umber.

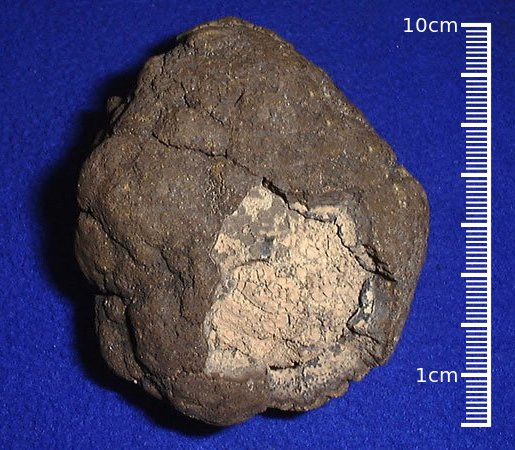
The presence of a large amount of manganese makes umber earth colors darker than ochre or sienna.

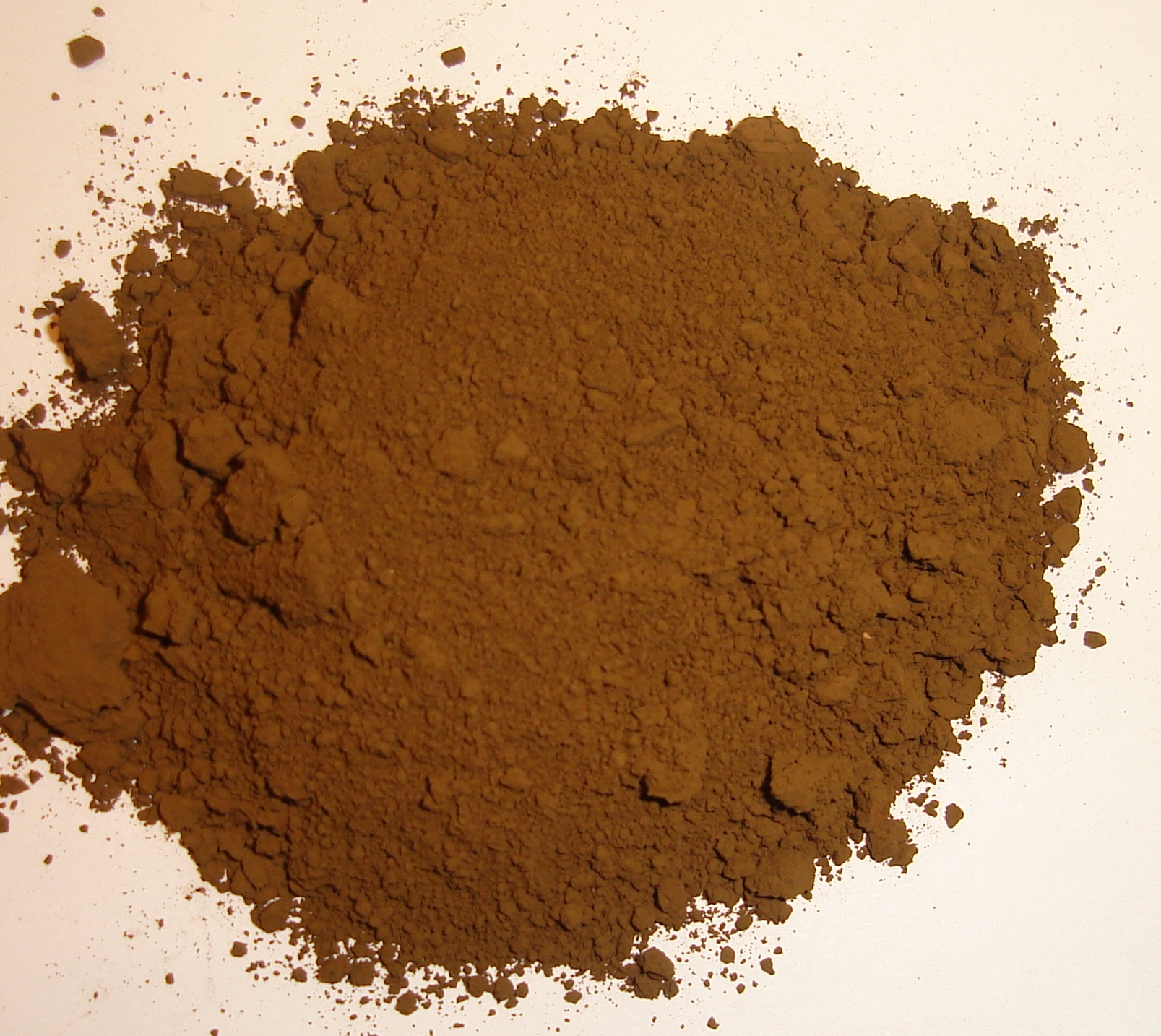
The pigment known as raw umber or natural umber came originally from Umbria, in Italy.

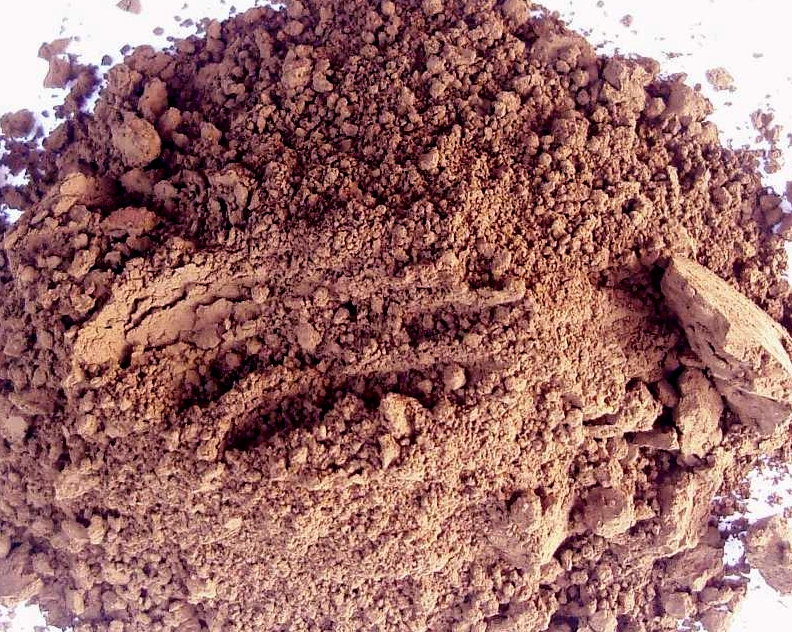
Another sample of natural umber pigment.

== Notable occurrences ==
Leonardo da Vinci, Mona Lisa, Early 16th century. A laboratory analysis has revealed the presence of umber.

Umber became widely used throughout the Renaissance period for oil paintings. In the Mona Lisa, Leonardo da Vinci used umber for the brown tones throughout his subject's hair and clothing. Da Vinci also extensively used umber in his painting the Last Supper to create shadows and outlines of the figures. Throughout the Baroque period, many renowned painters used umber.

Use in art
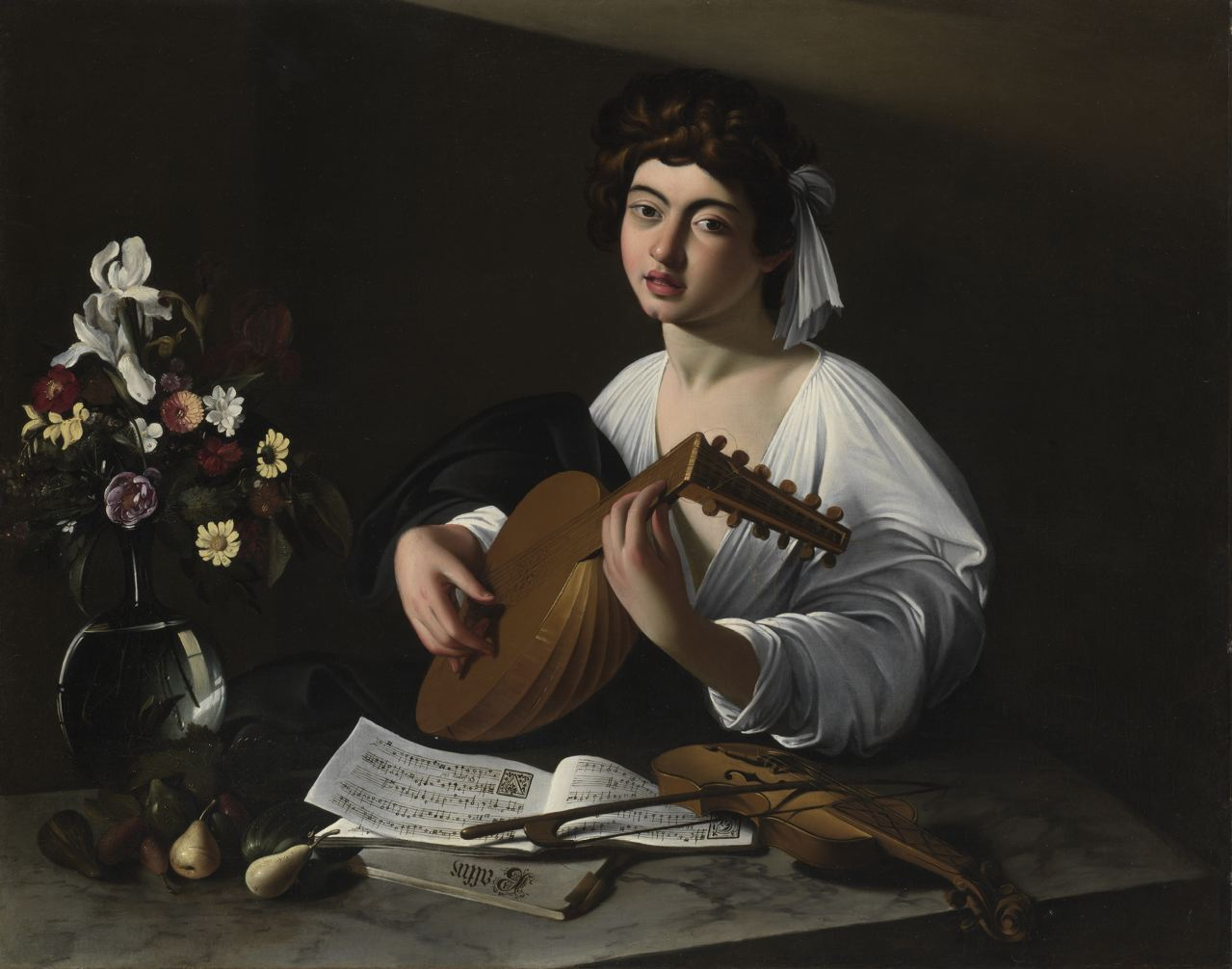
The Italian baroque painter Caravaggio used umber to create the darkness in his chiaroscuro ("light-dark") style of painting.

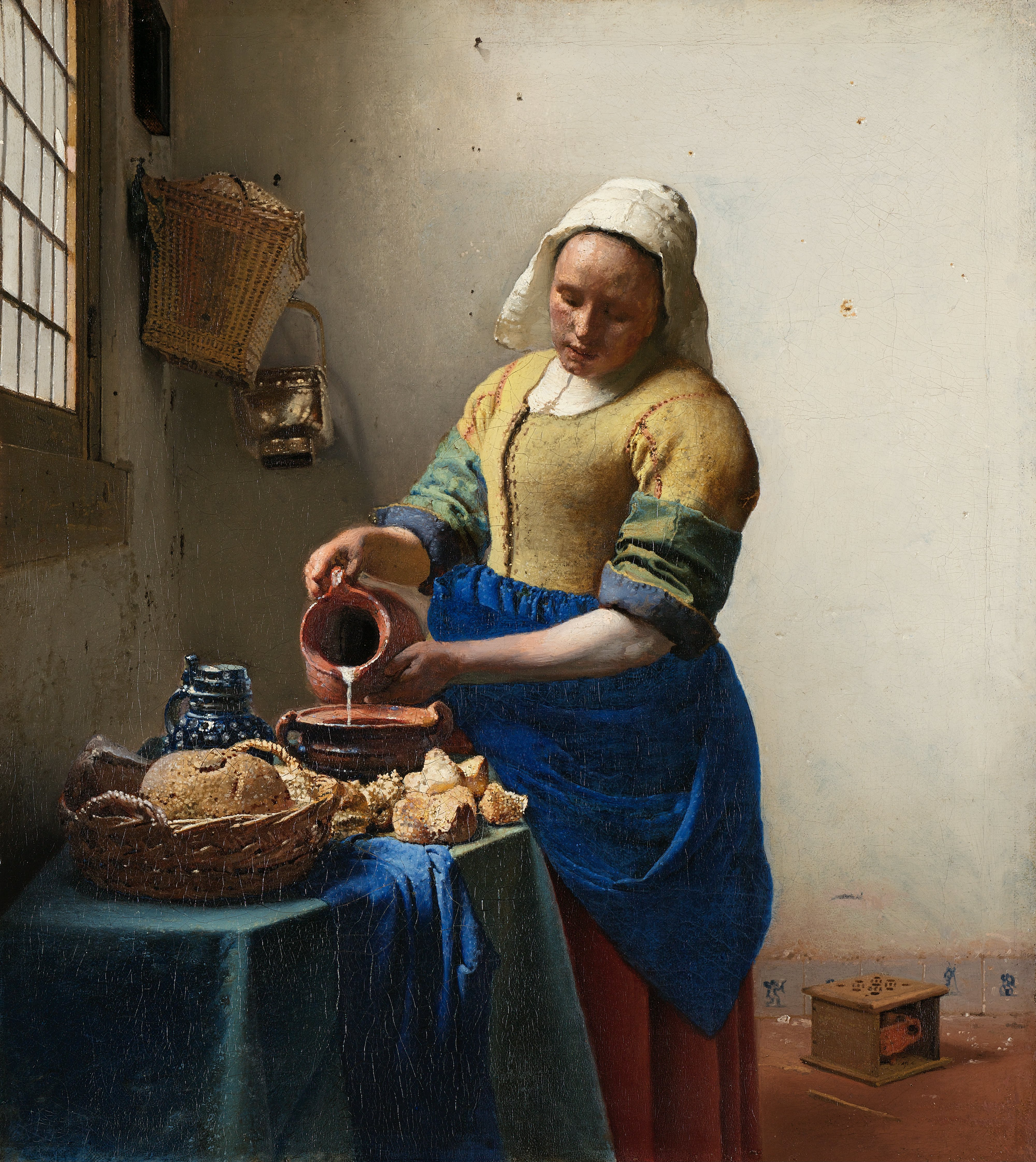
The milkmaid, by Johannes Vermeer (1650). Vermeer used umber for the shadows on the whitewashed walls, since they were warmer than those made with black.

Self portrait by Rembrandt van Rijn (1659). Rembrandt used umbers to create his rich and complex browns, as a ground, and to speed the drying of his paintings.

== Varieties ==
=== Raw umber ===
Raw Umber

Color coordinates
- Hex triplet: #826644
- sRGB^{B} (r, g, b): (130, 102, 68)
- HSV (h, s, v): (33°, 48%, 51%)
- CIELCh_{uv} (L, C, h): (45, 33, 52°)
- Source: ISCC-NBS
- ISCC–NBS descriptor: Moderate yellowish brown
- B: Normalized to [0–255] (byte)

This is the color raw umber.

=== Burnt umber ===
Burnt umber

Color coordinates
- Hex triplet: #8A3324
- sRGB^{B} (r, g, b): (138, 51, 36)
- HSV (h, s, v): (9°, 74%, 54%)
- CIELCh_{uv} (L, C, h): (34, 69, 17°)
- Source: Xona.com Color List
- ISCC–NBS descriptor: Strong reddish brown
- B: Normalized to [0–255] (byte)

Burnt umber is made by heating raw umber, which dehydrates the iron oxides and changes them partially to the more reddish hematite. It is used for both oil and water color paint.

The first recorded use of burnt umber as a color name in English was in 1650.

== See also ==
- Lists of colors
- List of inorganic pigments
