= Beige Book =

Report published by the United States Federal Reserve Board

The Beige Book, more formally called the Summary of Commentary on Current Economic Conditions, is a report published by the United States Federal Reserve Board eight times a year. The report is published in advance of meetings of the Federal Open Market Committee. Each report is a gathering of "anecdotal information on current economic conditions" by each Federal Reserve Bank in its district from "Bank and Branch directors and interviews with key business contacts, economists, market experts, and other sources".

It is called the Beige Book because its cover is colored beige.

== History ==
The Beige Book (at that time called the Redbook) was first collected under the direction of Arthur Burns in 1970, seeking to formalize the process of collecting qualitative understandings of the various districts under the Federal Reserve.

The Redbook became public in 1983 at the request of U.S. House of Representatives delegate Walter E. Fauntroy. In order to minimize the appearance of its importance in the FOMC's deliberations, the Fed changed its color from red to Tan (later to be identified as Beige and named as such) and began issuing it two weeks before FOMC meetings. Further care was taken to ensure that the document was anonymous with regard to the sources of the qualitative opinions within the text.

While there was initial concern about the book becoming the subject of overinterpretation, the document itself was not much noticed until after the stock market crash of 1987, where it would become more frequently mentioned within financial and news publications like The Wall Street Journal, The New York Times, and The Washington Post.

Consistent mention of the Beige Book has been made in public financial publications in years since, identifying it as both predictive and market influencing in nature - something which has since been followed up with scholarly consideration of these issues.

Beginning in 2017 the form and structure of the Beige Book has been changed to encourage more uniformity and comparability between individual districts reports.

The NPR economics podcast The Indicator gives out awards called "The Beigies" to recognize the most well-written or compelling entry in each edition of the book.

== Beige Book scholarship ==
While it was never the intention with the initial publication of the Beige Book that it would be predictive, various scholars have looked into its predictive or market influencing forces. This is further complicated by the fact that the language within individual districts varies in nature with how it identifies the current market, outside of the subjective evaluations identified. Other topics of research involve evaluating how effectively the Beige Book mirrors actual shifts in the financial climate of a given district. Current thoughts are that while the beige book may forecast to a small degree, its forecasts are largely influenced by various other factors like the irregular release schedule of the text and the more widely varying economic nature of each individual district.
