= Vintage design =

Valued object from an earlier era

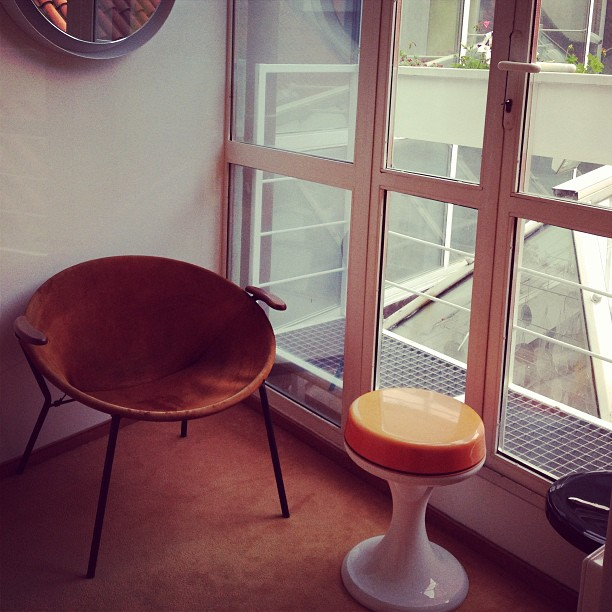
A vintage hotel

A vintage design is a design of another era that holds an important and recognizable value. Vintage styles can be applied to interior design, decor, clothing, gramophones, and other areas as well.

Vintage design is popular and famous. Outlets of vintage design vary from low-cost thrift store to luxury antique shops.

== Terminology ==
There is debate over what determines if an item is vintage. Some rely on the definition of anything old and of value. The most widely accepted definition used by antique and vintage professionals is anything older than 40 (and less than 100) years old.

The terms vintage, retro, and antique are often used interchangeably and have some overlap, but each has a distinct meaning. Retro refers to a style that is iconic of a previous era. Vintage typically describes an item made from high-quality materials or craftsmanship, representative of a specific time period or artist, and generally between 40 and 100 years old.

Antique, on the other hand, refers to items from earlier periods, specifically those that are at least 100 years old. A related term, antiquity, refers to objects from ancient times or past eras.

The word "vintage" originates from Late Middle English, derived from Old French and Latin.

== Popularity and fame ==
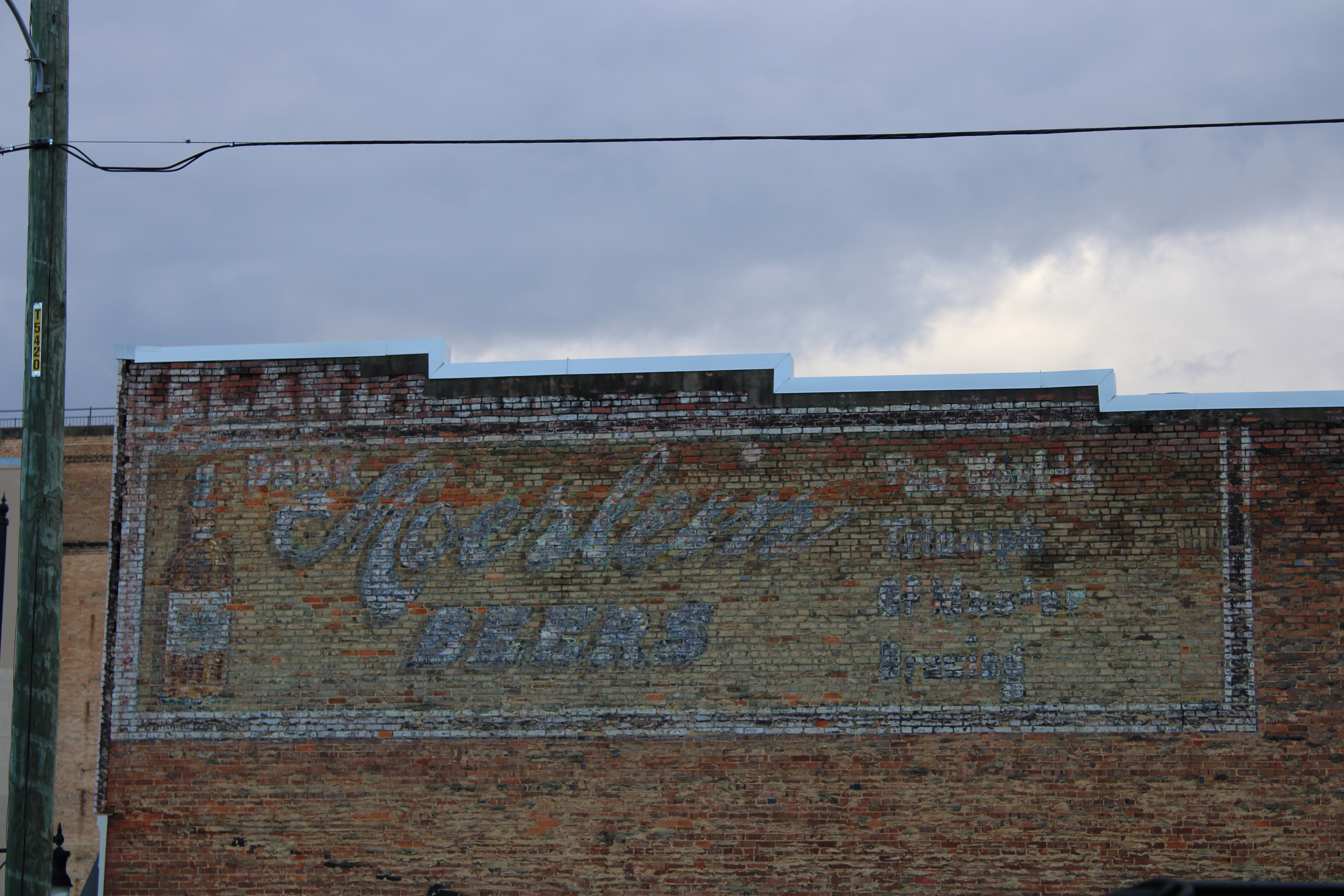
Vintage advertisement for beer on the side of a building in the Downtown Tuscaloosa Historic District, Alabama, United States

Vintage items spark interest in many. The United States Department of Labor tells us that, "Design and fashion trends play an important part in the production of furniture. The integrated design of the article for both esthetic and functional qualities is also a major part of the process of manufacturing furniture."

The popularity of vintage design and vintage inspired items can be seen through media. In 2004 designer Nicolas Ghesquière created a line for Balenciaga which called back to older collections. Tom Ford's collection for her also uses references to the past. Vintage design can also be seen in advertisements and commercials which promote vintage inspired clothing.

Vintage design on an advertisement

There are several reasons for vintage design's popularity. Some claim the phenomenon is due to the rarity and classic value of the items. Others state the reason to be a mixture of peoples' nostalgia creating a positive emotional appeal toward a past era or their childhood, consumers' environmental concerns, an appreciation of past styles and craftsmanship, and other experience.

== Subcategories ==
Vintage design contains various subcategories reflecting the vast diversity of aesthetics that make up traditional and 20th century design styles.

=== Art Nouveau ===
Art Nouveau is a style containing curved lines, flowers and other plants, contrasting colors, ornate colors, young women, and intricate details. It was created at the end of the 1800s and gained popularity at the start of the 1910s.

=== Art Deco ===
Art Deco was created to intentionally embrace a clean, modern, and man-made look, developed and popular from the 1920s and reaching its peak in the 1930s. This style features mostly geometric shapes, symmetrical patterns, and idealized human figures.

=== Mid-century modern ===
Mid-century modern style makes use of straight, clear lines, curved objects, wood tones, thin supporting, and oversized objects. It is meant to call back to the mid-20th century.

=== Atomic Age ===
Referring to the period roughly corresponding to 1940–1963, the Atomic Age includes elements of space exploration, scientific discovery, and futurism, creating an idea of an "optimistic, modern world". Atomic Age design became popular and instantly recognizable, with a use of atomic motifs and space age symbols.

=== International Style ===
International Style design contains broad block letters in fonts such as Helvetica (see Swiss Style for further information on the typographic style), and sleek, modern lines invoking Mies-ian simplicity and a cosmopolitan air.

=== Seventies ===
The styles of the 1970s are incredibly popular in vintage design, recalling the aesthetics of hippies and other counterculture groups of the era. Use of natural color combinations such as the well-known 'harvest gold, avocado green, and burnt orange' was widespread, as were psychedelic colors and designs such as paisley.

=== Punk ===
The punk counterculture style of the late 1970s and 1980s is reused today. It contains harsh lines, clashing colors, juxtaposition, and 'edgy' imagery to create an anti-authoritarian aesthetic.

=== Postmodernism ===
Postmodernism as a style incorporates bold colors and abstract geometric motifs with intentionally humorous references to past architectural and design traditions, popular in the 1980s and 1990s. Whereas 'less is more' was a tenet of modernism, postmodern architect Robert Venturi quipped 'less is a bore'. Postmodernism has heavily influenced the vaporwave aesthetic.

== See also ==
- Vintage clothing
- Cottagecore
- Retro style
