= Gold (color) =

Color

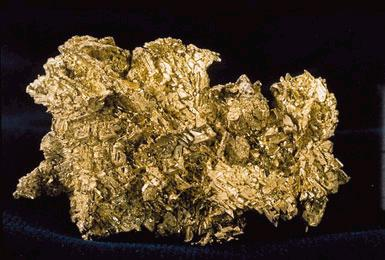
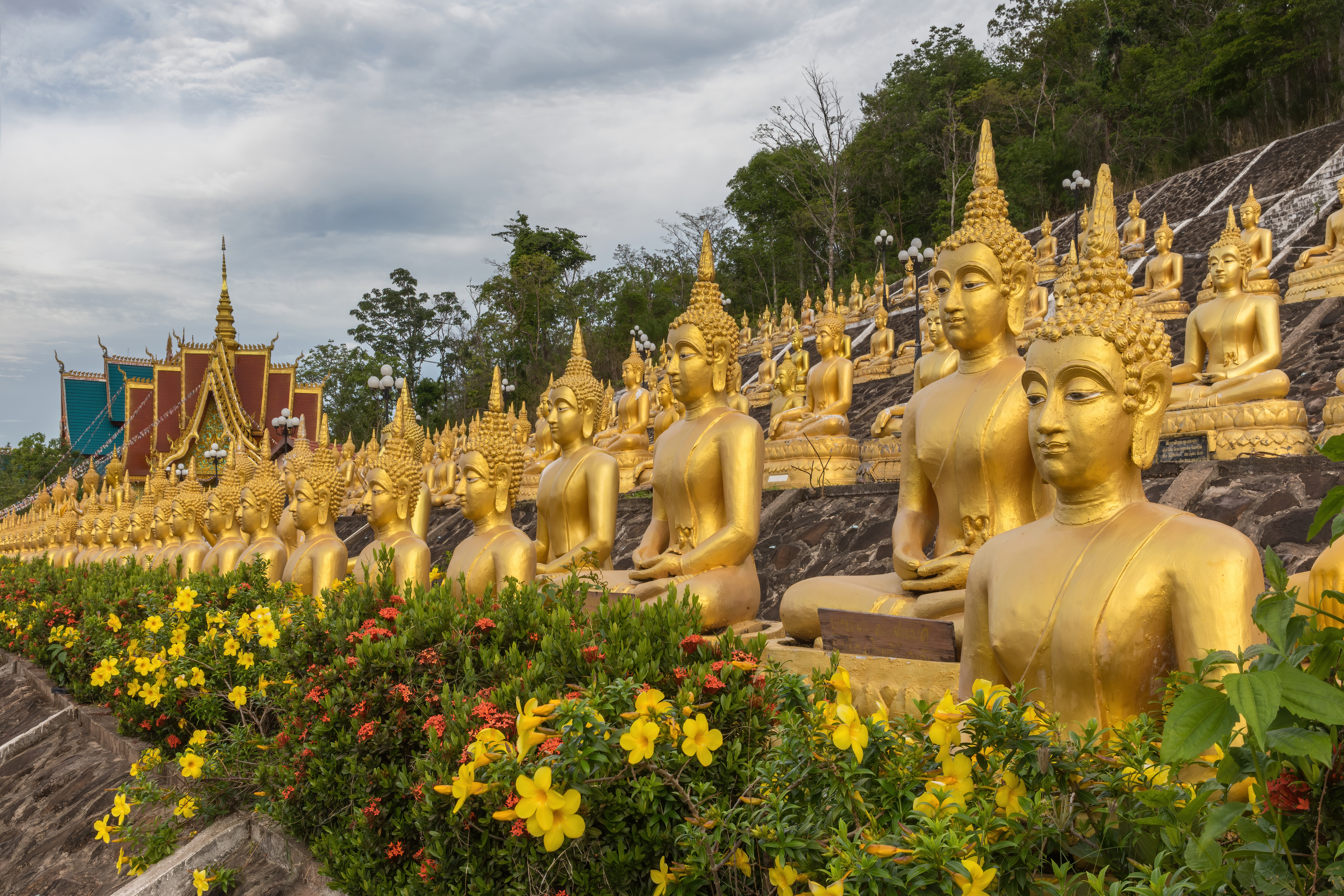
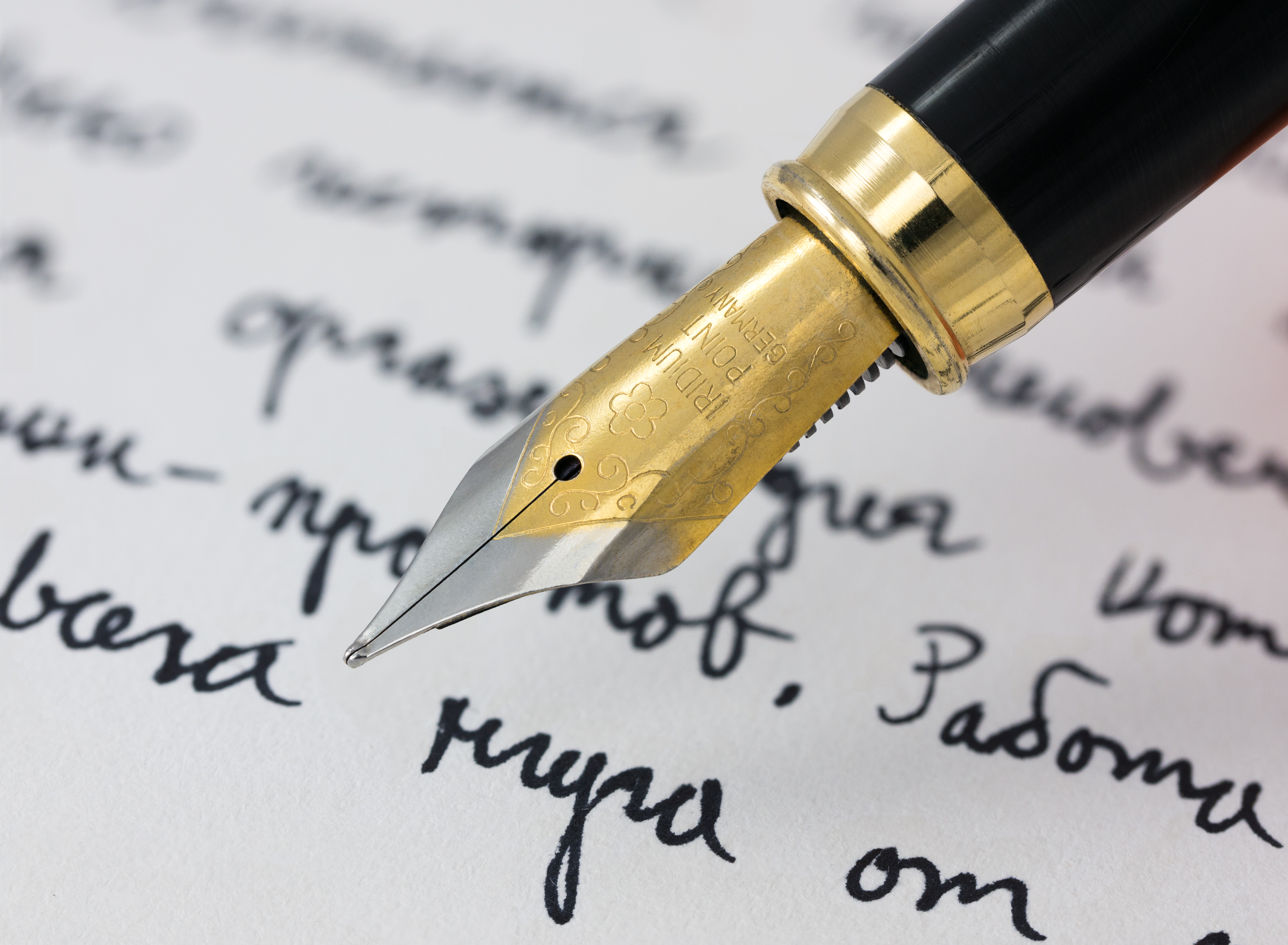
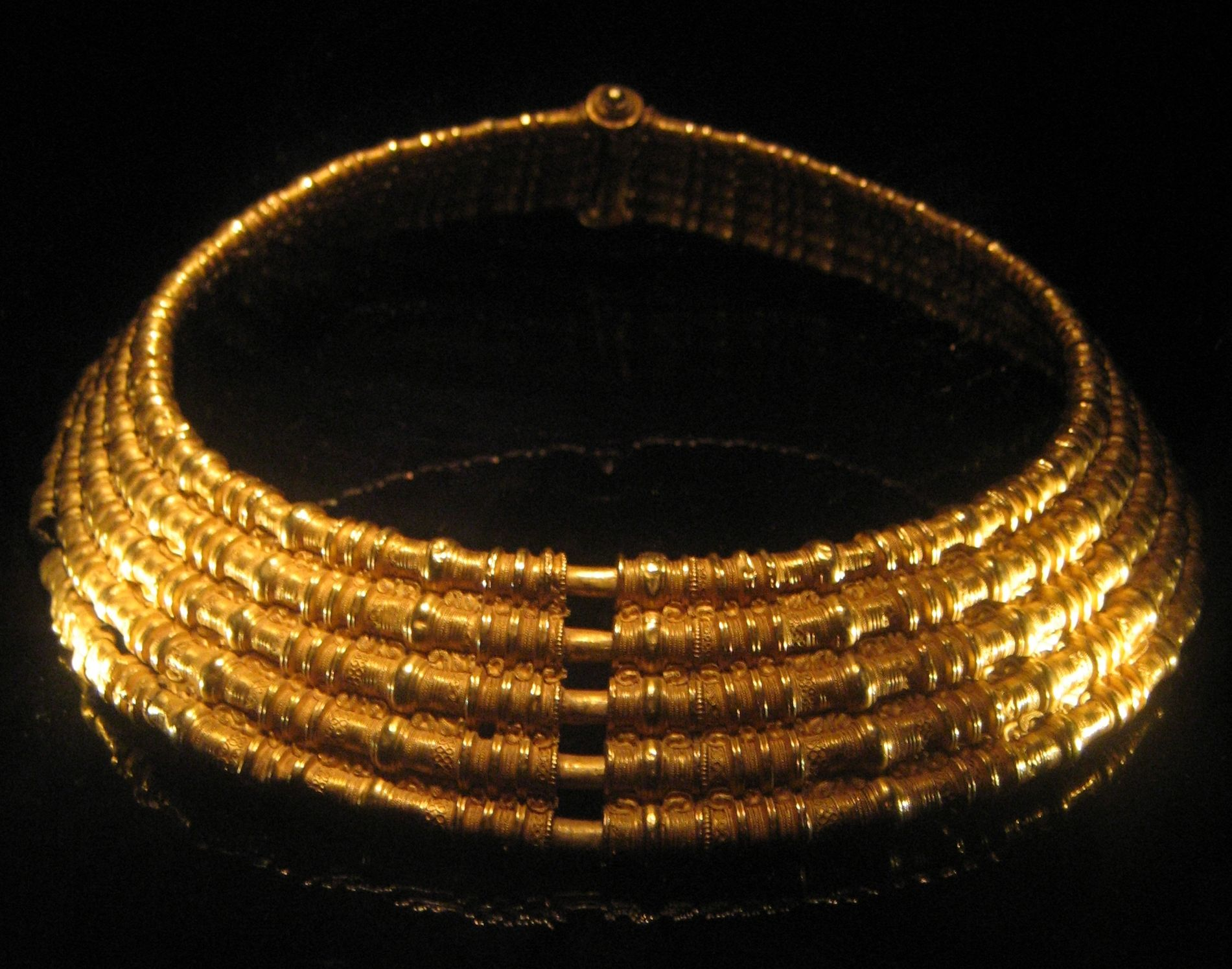
- Clockwise, from top left: A gold nugget; Golden statues of the Buddha in Pakse; Prehistoric golden necklace from Färjestaden; the Wikipedia logo in gold; A golden cuboctahedron; A fountain pen with a gilded nib.

Common connotations
- First place in a competition (champion), wealth

Color coordinates
- Hex triplet: #FFD700
- sRGB^{B} (r, g, b): (255, 215, 0)
- HSV (h, s, v): (51°, 100%, 100%)
- CIELCh_{uv} (L, C, h): (87, 99, 69°)
- Source: X11
- ISCC–NBS descriptor: Vivid yellow
- B: Normalized to [0–255] (byte)

Gold, also called golden, is a color tone resembling the chemical element gold.

The web color gold is sometimes referred to as golden to distinguish it from the color metallic gold. The use of gold as a color term in traditional usage is more often applied to the color "metallic gold" (shown below).

The first recorded use of golden as a color name in English was in 1300 to refer to the element gold. The word gold as a color name was first used in 1400 and in 1423 to refer to blond hair.

Metallic gold, such as in paint, is often called goldtone or gold tone, or gold ground when describing a solid gold background. In heraldry, the French word or is used. In model building, the color gold is different from brass. A shiny or metallic silvertone object can be painted with transparent yellow to obtain goldtone, something often done with Christmas decorations.

== Metallic gold ==
=== Gold (metallic gold) ===
Metallic gold

Color coordinates
- Hex triplet: #D4AF37
- sRGB^{B} (r, g, b): (212, 175, 55)
- HSV (h, s, v): (46°, 74%, 83%)
- CIELCh_{uv} (L, C, h): (73, 76, 65°)
- Source: ISCC-NBS
- ISCC–NBS descriptor: Strong yellow
- B: Normalized to [0–255] (byte)

At right is displayed a representation of the color metallic gold (the color traditionally known as gold) which is a simulation of the color of the actual metallic element gold itself—gold shade.

The source of this color is the ISCC-NBS Dictionary of Color Names (1955), a color dictionary used by stamp collectors to identify the colors of stamps—See color sample of the color Gold (Color Sample Gold (T) #84) displayed on indicated web page:

=== Web color gold vs. metallic gold ===
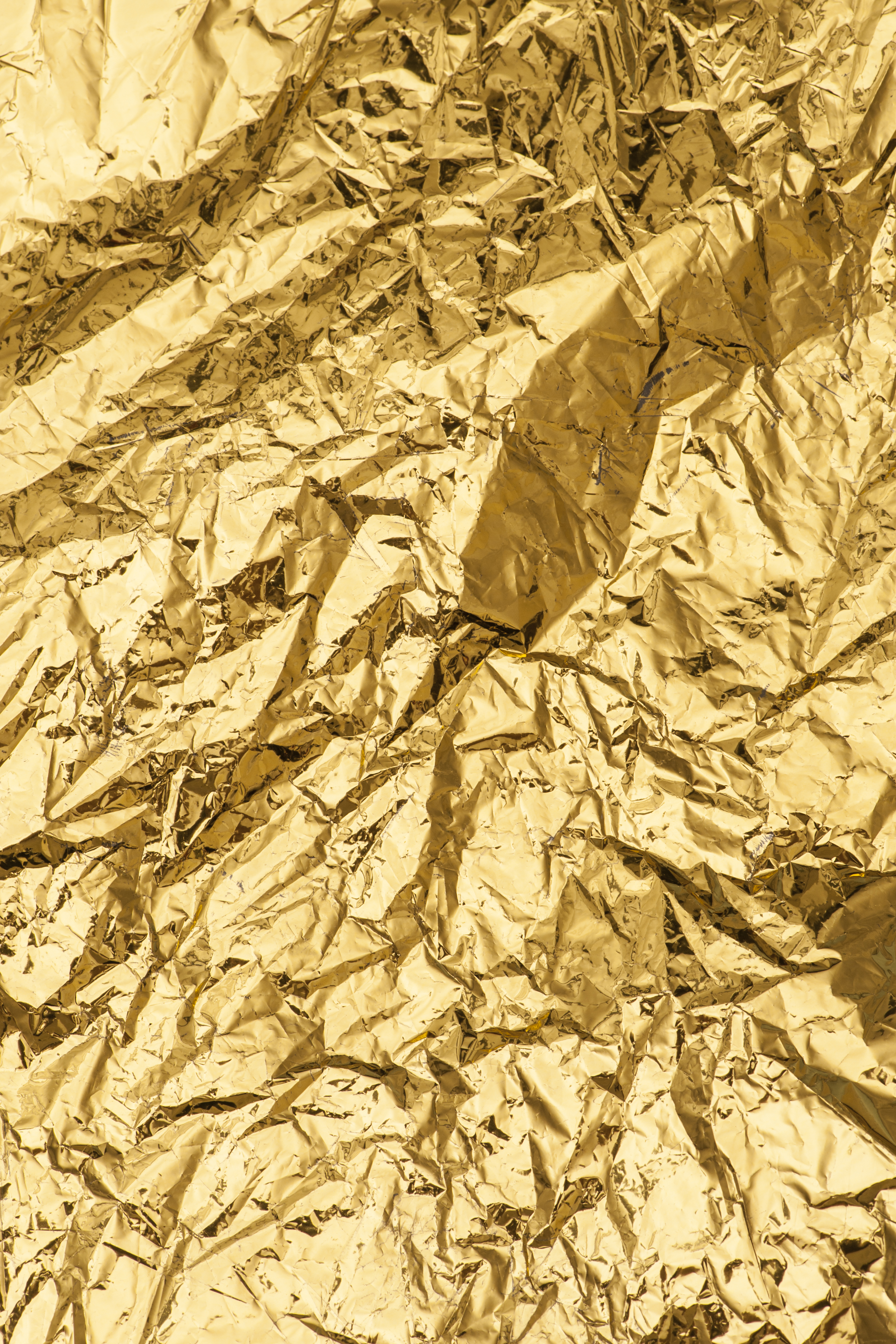
Metallic by nature

The American Heritage Dictionary defines the color metallic gold as "A light olive-brown to dark yellow, or a moderate, strong to vivid yellow."

Of course, the visual sensation usually associated with the metal gold is its metallic shine. This cannot be reproduced by a simple solid color, because the shiny effect is due to the material's reflective brightness varying with the surface's angle to the light source.

This is why, in art, a metallic paint that glitters in an approximation of real gold would be used; a solid color like that of the cell displayed in the adjacent box does not aesthetically "read" as gold. Especially in sacral art in Christian churches, real gold (as gold leaf) was used for rendering gold in paintings, e.g. for the halo of saints. Gold can also be woven into sheets of silk to give an East Asian traditional look.

More recent art styles, e.g. Art Nouveau, also made use of a metallic, shining gold; however, the metallic finish of such paints was added using fine aluminum powder and pigment rather than actual gold.

== Shades ==
=== Old gold ===
Old gold

Color coordinates
- Hex triplet: #CFB53B
- sRGB^{B} (r, g, b): (207, 181, 59)
- HSV (h, s, v): (49°, 71%, 81%)
- CIELCh_{uv} (L, C, h): (74, 74, 72°)
- Source: 99colors.net/Maerz and Paul
- ISCC–NBS descriptor: Strong yellow
- B: Normalized to [0–255] (byte)

Old gold is a dark yellow, which varies from heavy olive or olive brown to deep or strong yellow. The widely accepted color old gold is on the darker rather than the lighter side of this range.

The first recorded use of old gold as a color name in English was in the early 19th century (exact year uncertain). The official colors of Alpha Phi Alpha fraternity, founded in 1906 are black and old gold. The Delta Sigma Pi fraternity, founded in 1907, official colors are designated royal purple and old gold and Pi Kappa Alpha fraternity's colors are garnet and old gold.

Maroon and old gold are the colors of Texas State University's intercollegiate sports teams. Old Gold and black are the team colors of Purdue University Boilermakers intercollegiate sports teams. The Georgia Tech Yellow Jackets formerly wore white and old gold (now called Tech Gold). The Wake Forest Demon Deacons, UCF Knights, and Vanderbilt Commodores wear old gold and black. The UAB Blazers team colors are Forest Green and Old Gold. The New Orleans Saints list their official team colors as black, old gold and white.

=== Golden yellow ===
Golden yellow

Color coordinates
- Hex triplet: #FFDF00
- sRGB^{B} (r, g, b): (255, 223, 0)
- HSV (h, s, v): (52°, 100%, 100%)
- CIELCh_{uv} (L, C, h): (89, 100, 73°)
- Source: 99colors.net/Maerz and Paul
- ISCC–NBS descriptor: Vivid yellow
- B: Normalized to [0–255] (byte)

Golden yellow is the color halfway between amber and yellow on the RGB color wheel. It is a color that is 100% yellow and 12.5% magenta (CMYK color space).

The first recorded use of golden yellow as a color name in English was in the year 1597.

Golden Yellow is one of the colors of the United States Air Force, along with Ultramarine Blue.

=== Golden poppy ===
Golden poppy

Color coordinates
- Hex triplet: #FCC200
- sRGB^{B} (r, g, b): (252, 194, 0)
- HSV (h, s, v): (46°, 100%, 99%)
- CIELCh_{uv} (L, C, h): (81, 98, 60°)
- Source: 99colors.net/Maerz and Paul
- ISCC–NBS descriptor: Vivid yellow
- B: Normalized to [0–255] (byte)

Golden poppy is a tone of gold that is the color of the California poppy—the official state flower of California—the Golden State.

The first recorded use of golden poppy as a color name in English was in 1927.

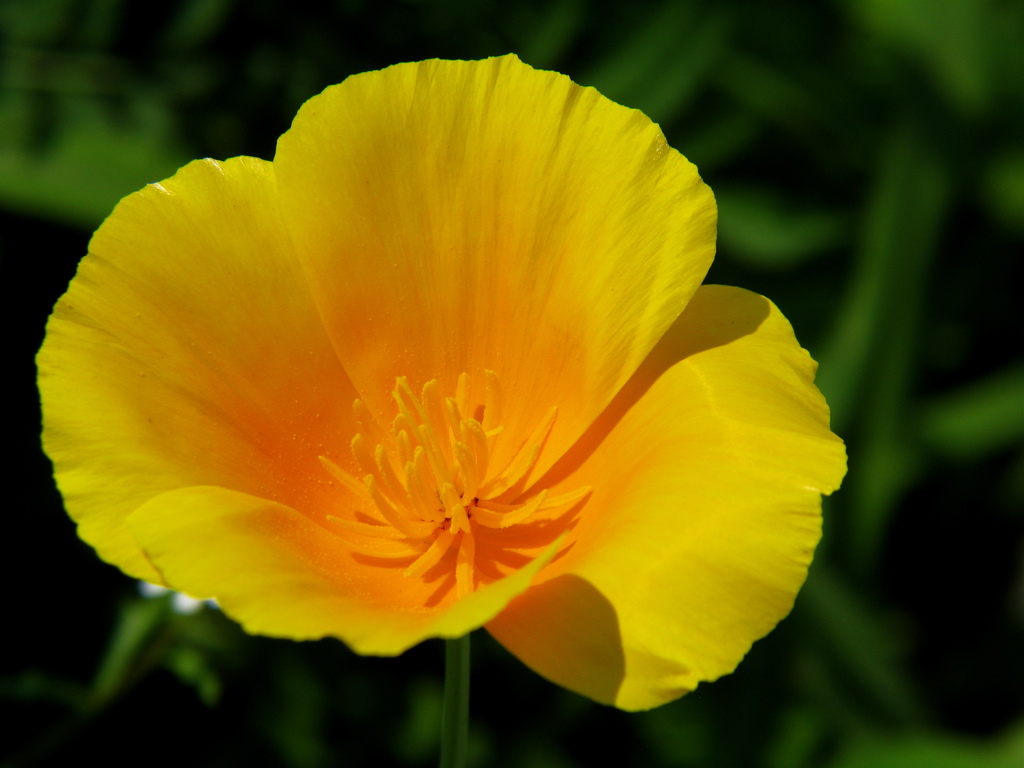
California poppy

=== Arizona State University (ASU) Gold ===
ASU Gold

Color coordinates
- Hex triplet: #FFC627
- sRGB^{B} (r, g, b): (255, 198, 39)
- HSV (h, s, v): (44°, 85%, 100%)
- CIELCh_{uv} (L, C, h): (83, 95, 60°)
- Source: ASU Brand Guide ASU Brand Guide
- ISCC–NBS descriptor: Vivid yellow
- B: Normalized to [0–255] (byte)

Gold is the oldest color associated with Arizona State University and dates back to 1896 when the school was named the Tempe Normal School. Gold signifies the "golden promise" of ASU. Gold also signifies the sunshine Arizona is famous for, including the power of the sun and its influence on the climate and the economy. The student section, known as The Inferno, wears gold on game days.

=== University of Southern California (USC) Gold ===
USC Gold

Color coordinates
- Hex triplet: #FFCC00
- sRGB^{B} (r, g, b): (255, 204, 0)
- HSV (h, s, v): (48°, 100%, 100%)
- CIELCh_{uv} (L, C, h): (84, 98, 64°)
- Source: USC Identity Guidelines
- ISCC–NBS descriptor: Vivid yellow
- B: Normalized to [0–255] (byte)

The official colors of the University of Southern California are Pantone 201C and Pantone 123C. These colors, designated as USC Cardinal and USC Gold, were adopted in 1895 by Rev. George W. White, USC's third president, and are equal in importance in identifying the USC Trojans.

=== California (Berkeley) Gold ===
California Gold

Color coordinates
- Hex triplet: #FDB515
- sRGB^{B} (r, g, b): (253, 181, 21)
- HSV (h, s, v): (41°, 92%, 99%)
- CIELCh_{uv} (L, C, h): (78, 99, 53°)
- Source: Brand Guidelines
- ISCC–NBS descriptor: Strong orange yellow
- B: Normalized to [0–255] (byte)

California Gold is one of the official colors of the University of California, Berkeley, as identified in their graphic style guide for use in on-screen representations of the gold color in the university's seal. For print media, the guide recommends to, "[u]se Pantone 7750 metallic or Pantone 123 yellow and 282 blue". The color is one of two most used by Berkeley, the other being Berkeley Blue; these, together, are the original colors of the University of California system, of which variations of blue and gold can be found in each campus' school colors.

=== Cal Poly Pomona gold ===
Cal Poly Pomona Gold

Color coordinates
- Hex triplet: #C6930A
- sRGB^{B} (r, g, b): (198, 147, 10)
- HSV (h, s, v): (44°, 95%, 78%)
- CIELCh_{uv} (L, C, h): (64, 78, 57°)
- Source: Graphic Standards
- ISCC–NBS descriptor: Deep yellow
- B: Normalized to [0–255] (byte)

Cal Poly Pomona gold was one of the two official colors of California State Polytechnic University, Pomona (Cal Poly Pomona). The official university colors were green (PMS 349) and gold (PMS 131). Cal Poly Pomona's Office of Public Affairs created the colors for web development and has technical guidelines, copyright and privacy protection; as well as logos and images that developers are asked to follow in the university's Guidelines for using official Cal Poly Pomona logos. If web developers are using gold on a university website, they were encouraged to use Cal Poly Pomona gold. Cal Poly Pomona has adopted a new brand color palette including a different gold color: #FFB500. The logo of the Cal Poly Pomona's athletic teams, the Cal Poly Pomona Broncos, has changed in 2014 to reflect the new gold color, but is currently using #FFB718.

=== UCLA Gold ===
UCLA Gold

Color coordinates
- Hex triplet: #FFD100
- sRGB^{B} (r, g, b): (255, 209, 0)
- HSV (h, s, v): (49°, 100%, 100%)
- CIELCh_{uv} (L, C, h): (85, 98, 66°)
- Source: UCLA Brand Guidelines
- ISCC–NBS descriptor: Vivid yellow
- B: Normalized to [0–255] (byte)

The color was approved by the University of California, Los Angeles (UCLA) Chancellor in October 2013. This is a shade of gold identified by the university for use in their printed publications.

=== MU Gold ===
MU Gold

Color coordinates
- Hex triplet: #F1B82D
- sRGB^{B} (r, g, b): (241, 184, 45)
- HSV (h, s, v): (43°, 81%, 95%)
- CIELCh_{uv} (L, C, h): (78, 89, 58°)
- Source: University of Missouri
- ISCC–NBS descriptor: Vivid yellow
- B: Normalized to [0–255] (byte)

MU Gold is used by the University of Missouri as the official school color along with black. Mizzou Identity Standards designated the color for web development as well as logos and images that developers are asked to follow in the university's Guidelines for using official Mizzou logos.

=== Pale gold ===
Gold (Crayola)

Color coordinates
- Hex triplet: #E6BE8A
- sRGB^{B} (r, g, b): (230, 190, 138)
- HSV (h, s, v): (34°, 40%, 90%)
- CIELCh_{uv} (L, C, h): (79, 50, 54°)
- Source: Crayola
- ISCC–NBS descriptor: Moderate orange yellow
- B: Normalized to [0–255] (byte)

The color pale gold is displayed at right.

This has been the color called gold in Crayola crayons since 1903.

Pale gold is one of the Lithuanian basketball club Lietkabelis Panevėžys primary colors.

=== Gold medal ===
Gold Medal

Color coordinates
- Hex triplet: #C5BC42
- sRGB^{B} (r, g, b): (197, 188, 66)
- HSV (h, s, v): (56°, 66%, 77%)
- CIELCh_{uv} (L, C, h): (75, 72, 81°)
- Source: Crayola
- B: Normalized to [0–255] (byte)

Gold medal is a tone of metallic gold included in Metallic FX crayons. It was introduced in 2019.

=== Sunglow ===
Sunglow

Color coordinates
- Hex triplet: #FFCC33
- sRGB^{B} (r, g, b): (255, 204, 51)
- HSV (h, s, v): (45°, 80%, 100%)
- CIELCh_{uv} (L, C, h): (84, 93, 63°)
- Source: Crayola
- ISCC–NBS descriptor: Vivid yellow
- B: Normalized to [0–255] (byte)

The color sunglow is displayed at right.

This is a Crayola crayon color formulated in 1990.

=== Harvest gold ===
Harvest gold

Color coordinates
- Hex triplet: #DA9100
- sRGB^{B} (r, g, b): (218, 145, 0)
- HSV (h, s, v): (40°, 100%, 85%)
- CIELCh_{uv} (L, C, h): (66, 90, 47°)
- Source: Crayola/Maerz and Paul
- ISCC–NBS descriptor: Deep orange yellow
- B: Normalized to [0–255] (byte)

The color harvest gold is displayed at right.

This color was originally called harvest in the 1920s.

The first recorded use of harvest as a color name in English was in 1923.

Harvest gold was a common color for metal surfaces (including automobiles and household appliances), as was the color avocado, during the whole decade of the 1970s. They were both also popular colors for shag carpets. Both colors (as well as shag carpets) went out of style by the early 1980s.

=== Goldenrod ===
Goldenrod

Color coordinates
- Hex triplet: #DAA520
- sRGB^{B} (r, g, b): (218, 165, 32)
- HSV (h, s, v): (43°, 85%, 85%)
- CIELCh_{uv} (L, C, h): (71, 83, 58°)
- Source: X11
- ISCC–NBS descriptor: Strong yellow
- B: Normalized to [0–255] (byte)

Displayed at right is the web color goldenrod.

The color goldenrod is a representation of the color of some of the deeper gold colored goldenrod flowers.

The first recorded use of goldenrod as a color name in English was in 1915.

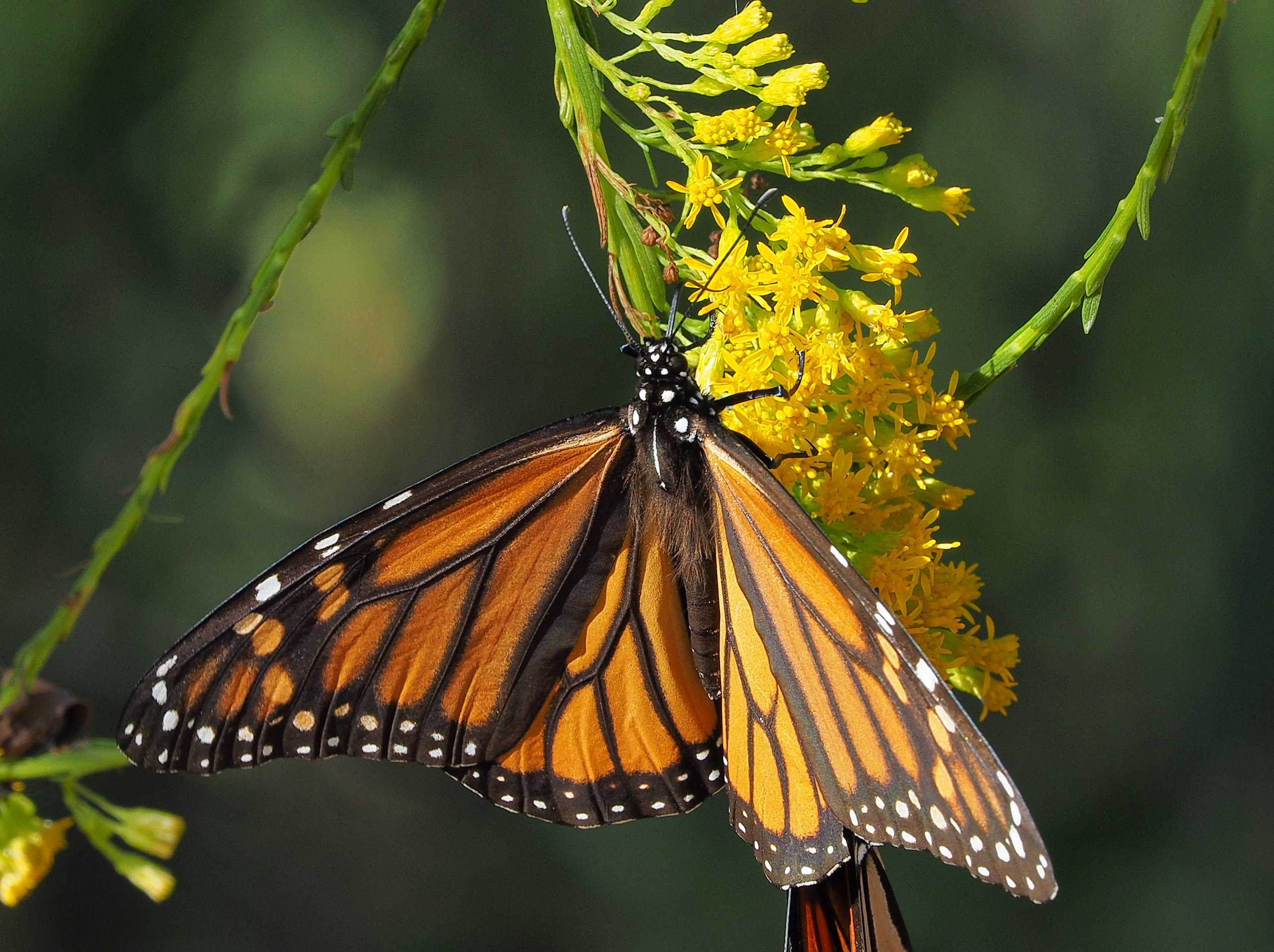
Monarch butterfly on goldenrod flower

=== Vegas gold ===
Vegas gold

Color coordinates
- Hex triplet: #C5B358
- sRGB^{B} (r, g, b): (197, 179, 88)
- HSV (h, s, v): (50°, 55%, 77%)
- CIELCh_{uv} (L, C, h): (73, 61, 74°)
- Source: 99colors.net
- ISCC–NBS descriptor: Moderate greenish yellow
- B: Normalized to [0–255] (byte)

Displayed at right is the color Vegas gold.

Vegas gold, rendered within narrow limits, is associated with the glamorous casinos and hotels of the Las Vegas Strip, United States.

Vegas gold is one of the official athletic colors for the Notre Dame Fighting Irish, Boston College Eagles, Colorado Buffaloes, South Florida Bulls, St. Vincent–St. Mary High School, Vanderbilt Commodores, the United States Naval Academy Midshipmen, and Western Carolina University Catamounts. It is one of the official colors of the NHL's Vegas Golden Knights, and was the type of gold the Pittsburgh Penguins used on their uniforms until they reverted to "Pittsburgh gold", the shade traditionally associated with the city.

=== Satin sheen gold ===
Satin sheen gold

Color coordinates
- Hex triplet: #CBA135
- sRGB^{B} (r, g, b): (203, 161, 53)
- HSV (h, s, v): (43°, 74%, 80%)
- CIELCh_{uv} (L, C, h): (68, 72, 61°)
- Source: 99colors.net
- ISCC–NBS descriptor: Deep yellow
- B: Normalized to [0–255] (byte)

At right is displayed the color satin sheen gold. This is the name of the color of the Starfleet command personnel uniform worn by Captain Kirk of the USS Enterprise in the TV show and movies Star Trek.

=== Golden brown ===
Golden brown

Color coordinates
- Hex triplet: #996515
- sRGB^{B} (r, g, b): (153, 101, 21)
- HSV (h, s, v): (36°, 86%, 60%)
- CIELCh_{uv} (L, C, h): (47, 61, 46°)
- Source: ISCC-NBS
- ISCC–NBS descriptor: Strong yellowish brown
- B: Normalized to [0–255] (byte)

The first recorded use of golden brown as a color name in English was in the year 1891. Golden brown is commonly referenced in recipes as the desired color of properly baked and fried foods.

=== Candlelight ===
Candlelight

Color coordinates
- Hex triplet: #F8D810
- sRGB^{B} (r, g, b): (248, 216, 16)
- HSV (h, s, v): (52°, 94%, 97%)
- CIELCh_{uv} (L, C, h): (87, 96, 72°)
- Source: hexcolor.co
- ISCC–NBS descriptor: Brilliant gold
- B: Normalized to [0–255] (byte)

Candlelight is a brilliant gold color.

== Golden in nature ==
Protista

- The golden algae or chrysophytes are a large group of heterokont algae, found mostly in freshwater.

Plants

- Golden bamboo (Phyllostachys aurea) is a bamboo species.
- The golden poppy and goldenrod are popular flowers to cultivate in horticulture.
- The Yukon Gold potato is a variety of potato recognizable through its smooth eyes and golden interior.

Animals

- The golden bamboo lemur (Hapalemur aureus) is a medium-sized bamboo lemur endemic to southeastern Madagascar.
- The golden eagle is a Northern Hemisphere bird of prey.
- The goldfish was one of the earliest fish to be domesticated, and is still one of the most commonly kept aquarium fish and water garden fish.
- The golden jackal is a medium-sized wild canine found in Asia and East Europe
- The Golden Retriever is a medium-sized breed of dog that is one of the most popular companion animals.
- The golden toad was an amphibian that used to live in Costa Rica that is now extinct.

== Chemical compounds ==
In addition to elemental gold, a number of compounds or alloys have a reflective gold hue:

- Several brasses, specifically those rich (65%+ wt.) in copper. Prince's metal is a brass-based gold simulant.
- Titanium nitride
- Zirconium nitride

== See also ==
- Or
- List of colors
