= Caroline Black =

Caroline Black may refer to:

- Caroline Black (botanist) (1887–1930), American botanist
- Caroline Black (badminton) (born 1994), Irish badminton player
