= Iglauer =

Iglauer is a surname. Notable people with the surname include:

- Bruce Iglauer (born 1947), American music industry executive
- Edith Iglauer (1917–2019), American non-fiction writer
- Helen Iglauer Glueck (1907–1995), American physician
