= Richard Steiner =

Richard Steiner may refer to:

- Rick Steiner (producer) (1946–2016), Broadway producer
- Richard C. Steiner (born 1945), Semitist
