= Kimidori Ribbon Project =

The Kimidori Ribbon Project is a Japanese campaign to ensure that parents are able to get joint custody of their children after a divorce.

In Japanese civil court, only one parent gets custody of any child produced during the marriage. The mother usually receives sole custody. The sole custodian can permanently prevent the other parent from ever seeing the child again.

The Japanese word kimidori refers to a yellow-green color.
