= Queasy Bake Cookerator =

Toy oven

- Type: Toy oven
- Invented by: Ronald Howes
- Company: Hasbro (2002–present)
- Country: United States
- Availability: 2002–c. 2003
- Materials: 100-watt incandescent light bulb
- Features: A pan, utensils, cookie cutter, and molds, along with mixes
- Slogan: "Looks gross, tastes great."
- Official website

The Queasy Bake Cookerator is a variant of the Easy-Bake Oven working toy oven, produced by Hasbro in 2002. It was discontinued soon afterwards. The toy uses a standard 100-watt incandescent light bulb as a heat source and has a warming chamber on top of the oven. While the Easy-Bake Oven is traditionally marketed towards girls, the Queasy Bake Cookerator represented Hasbro's attempt to branch into the male demographic by appealing to "boys' affinity for all things gross".

The Cookerator comes with packets of mix for making cookies, cakes, puddings, and dips (Chocolate Crud Cake Mix, Mucky Mud Mix, Bugs 'n Worms Mix, Delicious Dirt Mix, Crunchy Dog Bones Mix, Cool Drool Mix, Foaming Drool Eruptor Mix), a baking pan, cooking utensils, a cookie cutter, a mixing bowl, a bug/worm mold, a warmer cover, and a pan pusher. Additional mixes and molds could be purchased separately, including Oldy Moldy Cake, Larva-licious Cocoon Cookies, Bedbug Cake and Martian Invasion Cookies.

Also released in 2002, the Queasy Bake Mixerator is a toy blender meant to complement the Cookerator. The Mixerator is powered by two C batteries and includes its drink mix packets.
