= Walnut Hills High School =

Public school in Cincinnati, Ohio, US

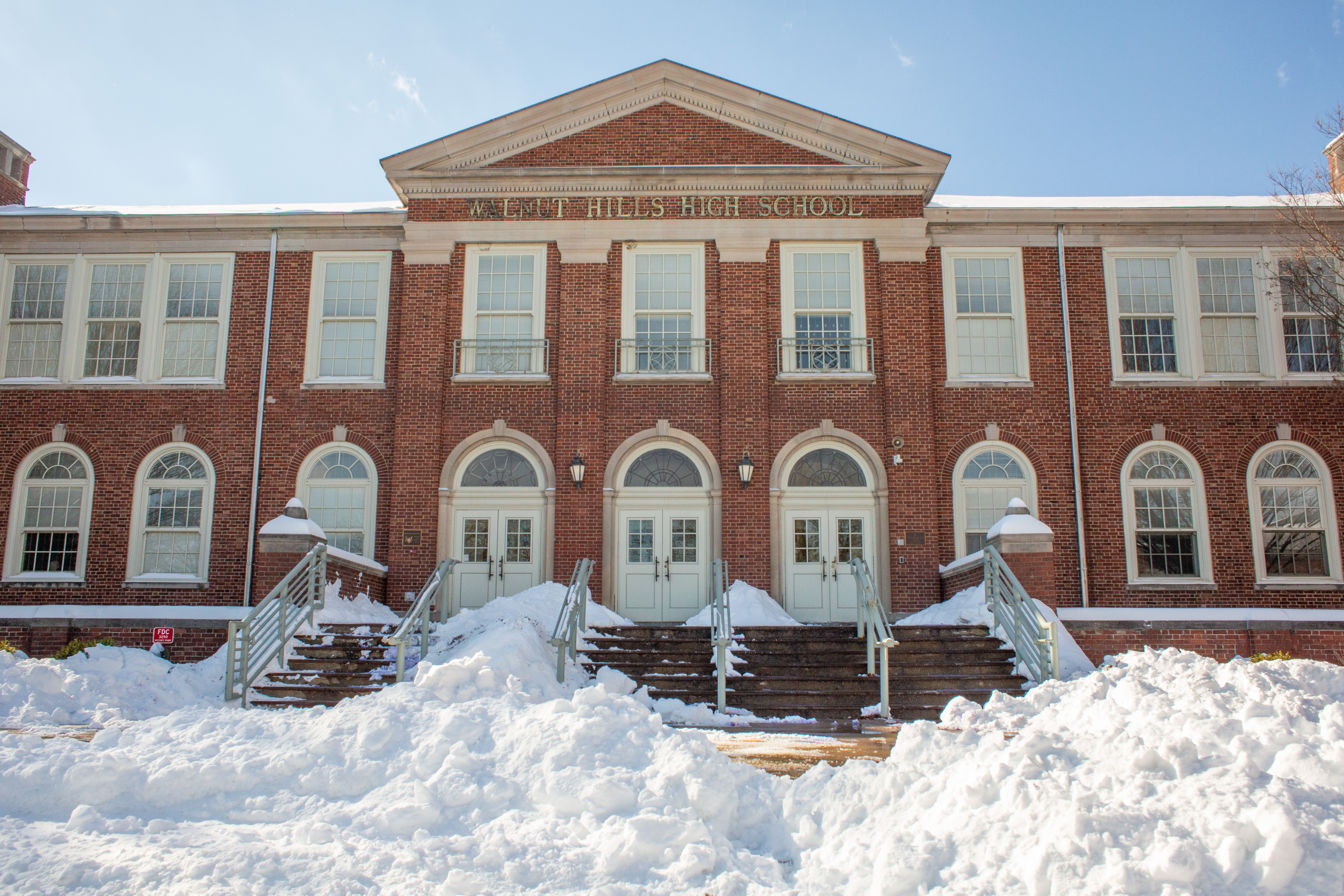
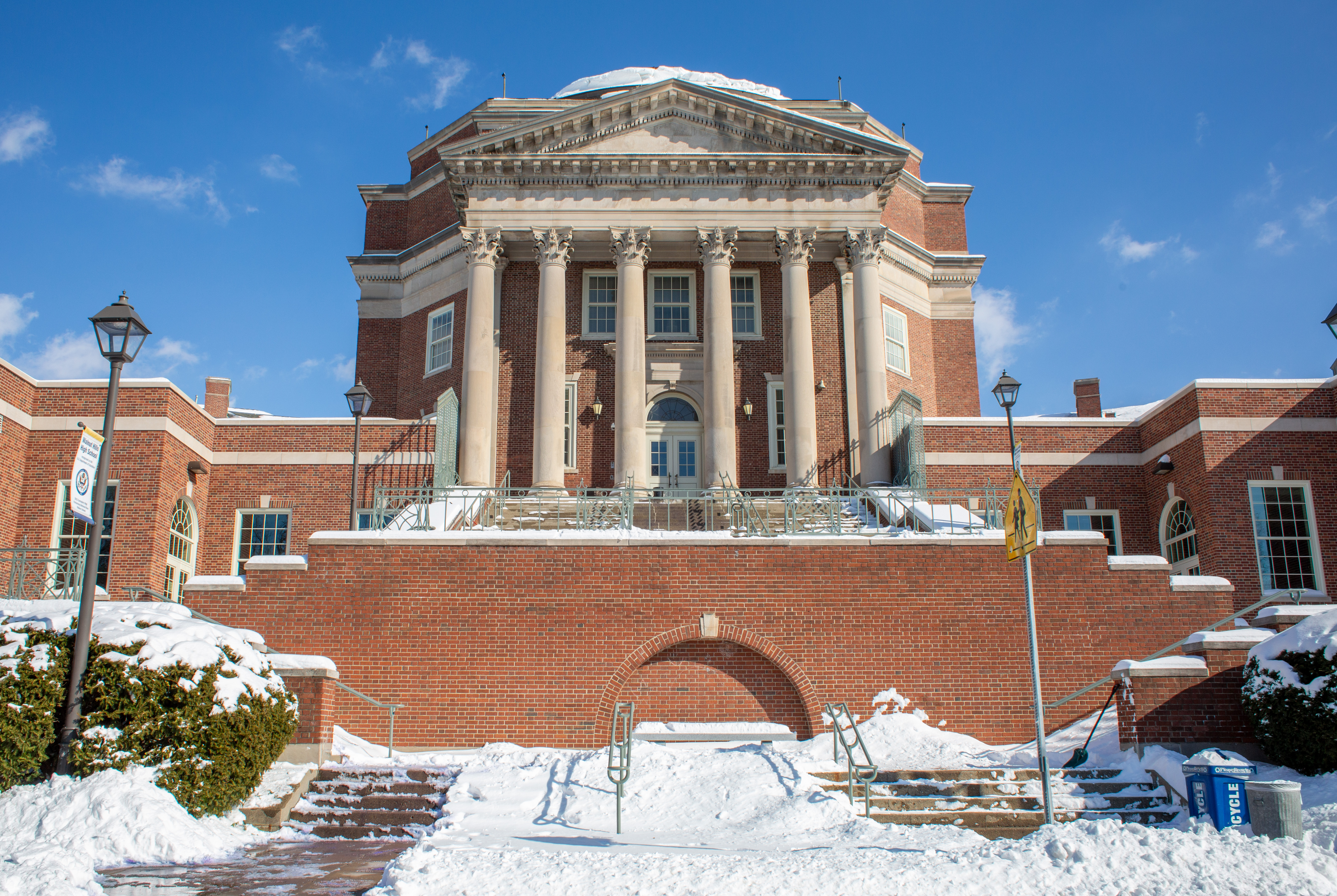
- Entrance at 1501 Blair Avenue (2026) Entrance at 3300 Sulsar Avenue (2026)

Location
- 3250 Victory Parkway; Cincinnati, Ohio 45207; United States; 39°8′28″N 84°28′47″W

Information
- Type: Public, Coeducational high school
- Motto: "Sursum ad Summum" (Latin: Rise to the Highest)
- Established: 1895
- School district: Cincinnati Public Schools
- Superintendent: Shauna Murphy
- Principal: John Chambers
- Teaching staff: 130.69 (FTE)
- Grades: 7-12
- Enrollment: 2,500 (2023-2024)
- Student to teacher ratio: 19.13
- Colors: Blue and Gold
- Athletics conference: Eastern Cincinnati Conference
- Nickname: Eagles
- Accreditation: North Central Association of Colleges and Schools
- USNWR ranking: 1st in Ohio (U.S. News & World Report, 2021)
- National ranking: 112th (U.S. News & World Report, 2021)
- Newspaper: The Chatterbox
- Yearbook: Remembrancer
- Website: www.walnuthillseagles.com

Walnut Hills High School is a public college-preparatory high school in Cincinnati, Ohio. Operated by Cincinnati Public Schools, it houses grades seven through twelve. The school was established in 1895 and has occupied its current building since 1932.

== History ==
The school was the third district public high school established in the city of Cincinnati, following Hughes H.S. and Woodward H.S., and was opened in September 1895 on the corner of Ashland and Burdett Avenues in Cincinnati. As a district high school, it accommodated the conventional four years (grades 9–12).

In 1916, several Black student athletes decided to break an unwritten rule that only White students could enter the school's front yard. As a result, many of the White students walked out, threatening to strike unless all Black students were expelled. The district superintendent refused to expel the Black students.

A new building on Victory Boulevard (now Victory Parkway) was built on 14 acres (57,000 m^{2}) acquired from the Catholic Archdiocese of Cincinnati and completed in 1931. Designed by architect Frederick W. Garber's firm, it remains in use today. The facility was designed for 1700 students and included 31 classrooms, 3 study halls, choral harmony and band rooms, a general shop, a print shop, a mechanical drawing room, 2 swimming pools (separate swimming for boys and girls), a library, a large and a small auditorium, and a kitchen for teaching cooking (with pantry and adjacent living room and dining room).

Four temporary, prefabricated steel classrooms were installed in 1958 to accommodate the increasing student population.

== Clubs and activities ==
Walnut Hills' Latin Club functions as a local chapter of both the Ohio Junior Classical League (OJCL) and National Junior Classical League (NJCL).

== Notable alumni ==
- Darren Anderson (1987) — professional football player (NFL 1992–1998)
- Stan Aronoff (1950) — politician and longtime member of the Ohio Senate
- Helen Elsie Austin (1924) — attorney, US Foreign Service Officer, first black female graduate of UC Law School, first black woman to serve as assistant attorney general of Ohio
- Theda Bara (Theodosia Goodman 1903) — early movie star of the silent screen
- Janet Biehl (1971) — author and graphic novelist
- Caroline Black (1887–1930) — botanist
- Jowon Briggs (2019) — professional football player for the New York Jets
- Ric Bucher (1979), NBA correspondent, author and radio presenter
- Elisabeth Bumiller (1974) — The New York Times White House correspondent
- Nina Castagna — Olympic rower
- Stanley M. Chesley (1954) — attorney who won Bhopal, MGM Grand, and Beverly Hills Supper Club fire class action settlements
- Michael L. Chyet (1975) — linguist
- Carl W. Condit (1932) — historian of urban and architectural history
- Douglas S. Cramer (1949) — TV and Broadway producer, art collector, co-founder and board member of Museum of Contemporary Art, Los Angeles, board member Museum of Modern Art, New York.
- Naomi Deutsch (1908) — public health nursing administrator, author
- Jim Dine (1953) — pop artist
- Michael Dine (1971) — theoretical physicist
- Alan Dressler (1966) — astronomer and astrophysicist
- Elizabeth Brenner Drew (1953) — political journalist, author and lecturer
- Isadore Epstein (1937) — astronomer
- Frank Benjamin Foster, III (1946) —saxophonist, composer, member of Count Basie Orchestra
- Paula Froelich — columnist, Page Six of the New York Post
- Helen Iglauer Glueck (1925) — physician and hematology researcher
- Dick Gordon — professional football player 1965–1974 for Chicago, Green Bay, Los Angeles, San Diego
- Bill Gradison — mayor of Cincinnati (1945)
- Marcel Groen (1963) — attorney and chairman of the Pennsylvania Democratic Party
- Charles Guggenheim (1942) — four-time Academy Award-winner for documentaries
- Richard S. Hamilton — geometer who discovered the Ricci flow (and applied it to the Poincaré conjecture), winner of the Veblen and Shaw Prizes
- Fred Hersch — jazz composer and musician, Grammy Award nominee
- Charles R. Hook, Sr. (1898) — American industrialist, former president of Armco Steel Corp
- Ronald Howes — toy inventor; invented the Easy-Bake Oven
- DeHart Hubbard (1921) — first African-American to win an individual gold medal in the Olympics (long jump, 1924 Paris Summer Games)
- Miller Huggins (1897) — managed Babe Ruth and the New York Yankees, inducted into the Baseball Hall of Fame in 1964
- Rick Hughes (1991) — professional basketball player in European leagues
- Dani Isaacsohn (2007) - politician
- Fred Karpoff (1981) — pianist
- Glenn Kessler (1977) - Washington Post editor and reporter
- Kenneth Koch (1947) — poet of the New York School, dramatist and educator
- Walter Laufer — Olympic gold medalist
- James Levine (1961) — pianist, conductor, musical director of the Metropolitan Opera and the Boston Symphony Orchestra
- Steven Levinson (1964) — associate justice of the Supreme Court of Hawaii from 1992 to 2008
- Sabina Magliocco (1977) — professor of anthropology and religion at the University of British Columbia
- Jonathan Meyer (1982) — lawyer and general counsel of the United States Department of Homeland Security
- Alexis Nikole Nelson — forager and internet personality
- John Newland - Actor, Director, Host of TV's "One Step Beyond"
- Stanley B. Prusiner (1960) — 1997 Nobel Prize for medicine
- Carl West Rich (1916) — attorney, Hamilton County prosecutor, city councilman and three-term mayor of Cincinnati, US congressman
- Lois Rosenthal — author, publisher, arts & humanities philanthropist.
- Jerry Rubin — 1960s-era radical and later a social activist
- Stephen Sanger (1964) — chairman and CEO of General Mills
- Robert Shmalo (1996) — international ice dancing competitor
- Itaal Shur (1985) — Grammy Award-winner (2000)
- Lee Smolin (1972) — theoretical physicist
- Donald Andrew Spencer Sr. (1932) — first African American trustee of Ohio University
- Rick Steiner (1964) — stockbroker, professional poker player, five-time Tony Award-winning Broadway producer
- Mary Lee Tate (c. 1907) — painter
- MaCio Teague (2015) — basketball player, member of the NCAA Champion 2020–21 Baylor Bears basketball team
- Jane Timken (1985) — attorney
- Tony Trabert (1948) — tennis star of the 1950s, won 1955 French Open, Wimbledon, and US Open
- Jean Trounstine (1965) — author, actress, activist on prison issues
- Jonathan Valin (1965) — mystery series novelist
- Evelyn Venable (1930) — Hollywood actress with star on Hollywood Walk of Fame; professor of ancient Greek and Latin at UCLA
- Richard Weber — Emeritus Professor on the Faculty of Mathematics, University of Cambridge
- Worth Hamilton Weller (1931) — herpetologist
- Mary Wineberg (1998) — track and field Olympian, gold medalist in the women's 4 × 400 m relay at the 2008 Beijing Olympics
