= Shag carpet =

Carpet with a deep pile

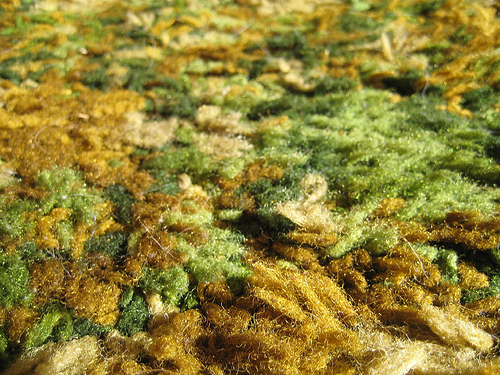
Close-up of the pile of a shag carpet, including two popular colors of the 1970s: avocado and harvest gold

Shag carpet is a style of high pile carpet with cut pile yarns that are from 1½ to 3 inches long. The shag carpets which became popular in the 1960s and 1970s in the post-war era were inspired by much older Scandinavian rya and Greek flokati rugs and the desire to use newly developed synthetic fibers like nylon and acrylic.

In the 17th century, the term was used to refer to inferior silk material.

Graceland is known for having well-preserved shag carpeting because Elvis liked the material.
