= Rick Steiner (producer) =

American producer (1946–2016)

- Born: Richard Harris Steiner; November 8, 1946; Cincinnati, Ohio
- Died: November 3, 2016 (aged 69); Cincinnati, Ohio
- Occupation: Broadway producer

Richard Harris Steiner (November 8, 1946 – November 3, 2016) was a five-time Tony Award-winning Broadway producer, whose hits included The Producers, Hairspray, and Jersey Boys.

== Biography ==
Steiner was born in Cincinnati, to Philip Steiner, a founder of Kenner Products, the maker of the Easy-Bake Oven and Play-Doh; and Desirée (Harris) Steiner. Desirée Steiner was the daughter of Desirée Lazard, a Broadway actress, and Harry Harris, a former boxer known as the Human Hairpin. The two met in 1906 when she was appearing as Tessy Tarrytown in George M. Cohan's "Forty-Five Minutes From Broadway," at the New Amsterdam Theater; he was the theater's manager. Steiner had one brother, Corky.

Steiner acted in community theater productions as a child. He attended Camp Thunderbird in Bemidji, Minn., where he met fellow camper Rocco Landesman, who would become his business partner in later years. Steiner graduated from Walnut Hills High School in Cincinnati, and went on to earn a BA in economics from the University of Wisconsin in 1968, and an MBA from the University of Chicago in 1970.

Steiner's marriage to the former Jan Steele ended in divorce, but the two continued to live together. They had two sons, Ace and Duke, and a daughter, Jacklyn Montgomery.

He died in Cincinnati at the age of 69 on November 3, 2016.

== Career ==
Steiner had already achieved considerable success as a discount stockbroker and professional poker player when his childhood friend Rocco Landesman approached him to invest in Big River, a musical based on The Adventures of Huckleberry Finn, in the 1980s. Despite a slow start at the box office, Big River went on to win seven Tony Awards. Steiner and Landesman, along with a group of other investors assembled by Steiner, went on to produce Into the Woods, The Secret Garden, Smokey Joe's Cafe, Hairspray, Jersey Boys, and The Producers, which went on to win a record 12 Tony Awards in 2001.

There were flops as well, including The Times They Are A-Changin', based on the works of Bob Dylan and choreographed by Twyla Tharp; The Wedding Singer; and Honeymoon in Vegas.

He also produced two non-musical plays, Topdog/Underdog, which won a Pulitzer Prize for its author, Suzan-Lori Parks; and Tracy Letts's August: Osage County, which won five Tonys.

Throughout his producing career, Steiner largely focussed on the marketing, investor relations, and merchandising side of the business. He worked out of his childhood home on Rose Hill Avenue, in the North Avondale neighborhood of Cincinnati. In between producing Broadway hits, he continued to play poker professionally, in 1992 winning $105,000 and the seven-card-stud title in the World Series of Poker. He also won trophies at the Super Bowl of Poker in Lake Tahoe, the Superstars of Poker, and the Diamond Jim Brady Tournament in Bell Gardens, California. Steiner was also a part-owner of the Cincinnati Reds, and one of the original investors in the Chi-Chi's restaurant chain, buying stock when he was just in fourth grade.

Steiner was a board member of the Cincinnati Playhouse in the Park, Ensemble Theatre Cincinnati, and the Cincinnati School for Creative and Performing Arts.

At his death, Steiner was working on a musical adaptation of the movie "Bull Durham."

== Credits ==
=== Musicals ===
- Big River (1985)
- Into the Woods (1987)
- The Secret Garden (1991)
- Smokey Joe's Cafe (1995)
- The Producers (2001)
- Hairspray (2002)
- Jersey Boys (2005)
- The Times They Are a-Changin' (2006)
- The Wedding Singer (2006)
- Honeymoon in Vegas (2015)

=== Plays ===
- Topdog/Underdog (2002)
- August: Osage County (2007)
