= Worth Hamilton Weller =

American herpetologist (1913–1931)

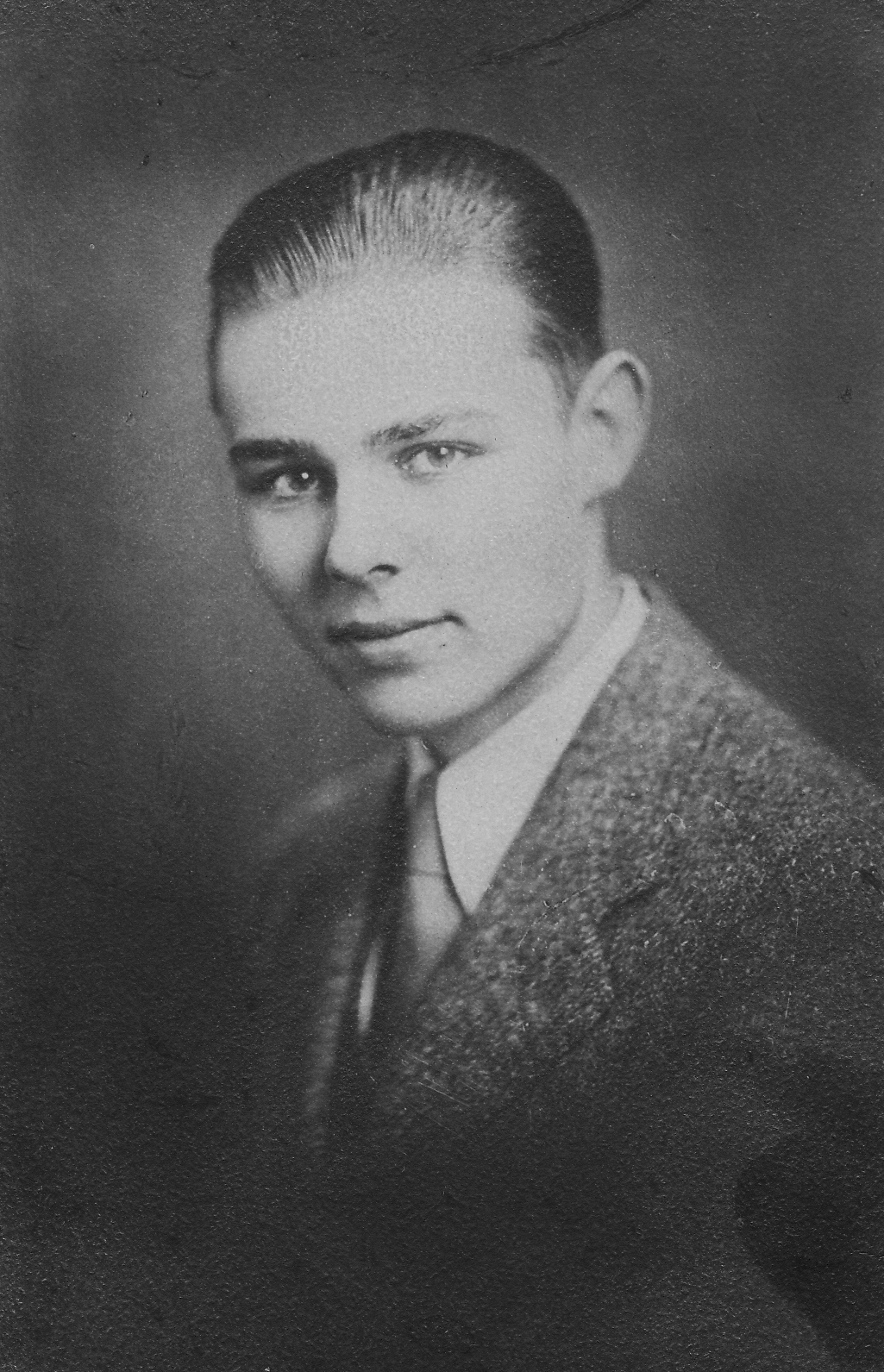
Worth Hamilton Weller in 1930.

Worth Hamilton Weller (May 28, 1913 – June 22, 1931) was an American herpetologist who discovered two new salamanders, Gyrinophilus porphyriticus duryi and Weller's salamander (Plethodon welleri).

Weller died in a fall from a cliff at Grandfather Mountain near Linville, North Carolina.

== Early life ==
Weller was born in Cincinnati, Ohio. His parents were Arthur Douglas Weller and Ruth Hamilton Weller.

== Herpetology ==
His interest in herpetology, specializing in salamanders, developed when he was a young boy. He explored nearby fields and woods with his friend Karl Maslowski (1913–2006), who went on to become a well known wildlife photographer. Soon Weller was recording observations for the Cincinnati Museum of Natural History. Shortly after the director of the museum, Ralph E. Dury (1899–1984) established the Cincinnati Junior Society of Natural Sciences, Weller joined in 1928 and at the age of sixteen, became its business manager and Curator of Herpetology.

Weller carried out an extensive correspondence with the herpetologist Emmett Reid Dunn, which led to his acceptance at Haverford College. Between 1930 and 1932, he published 12 papers, most of which were reprinted in 1965.

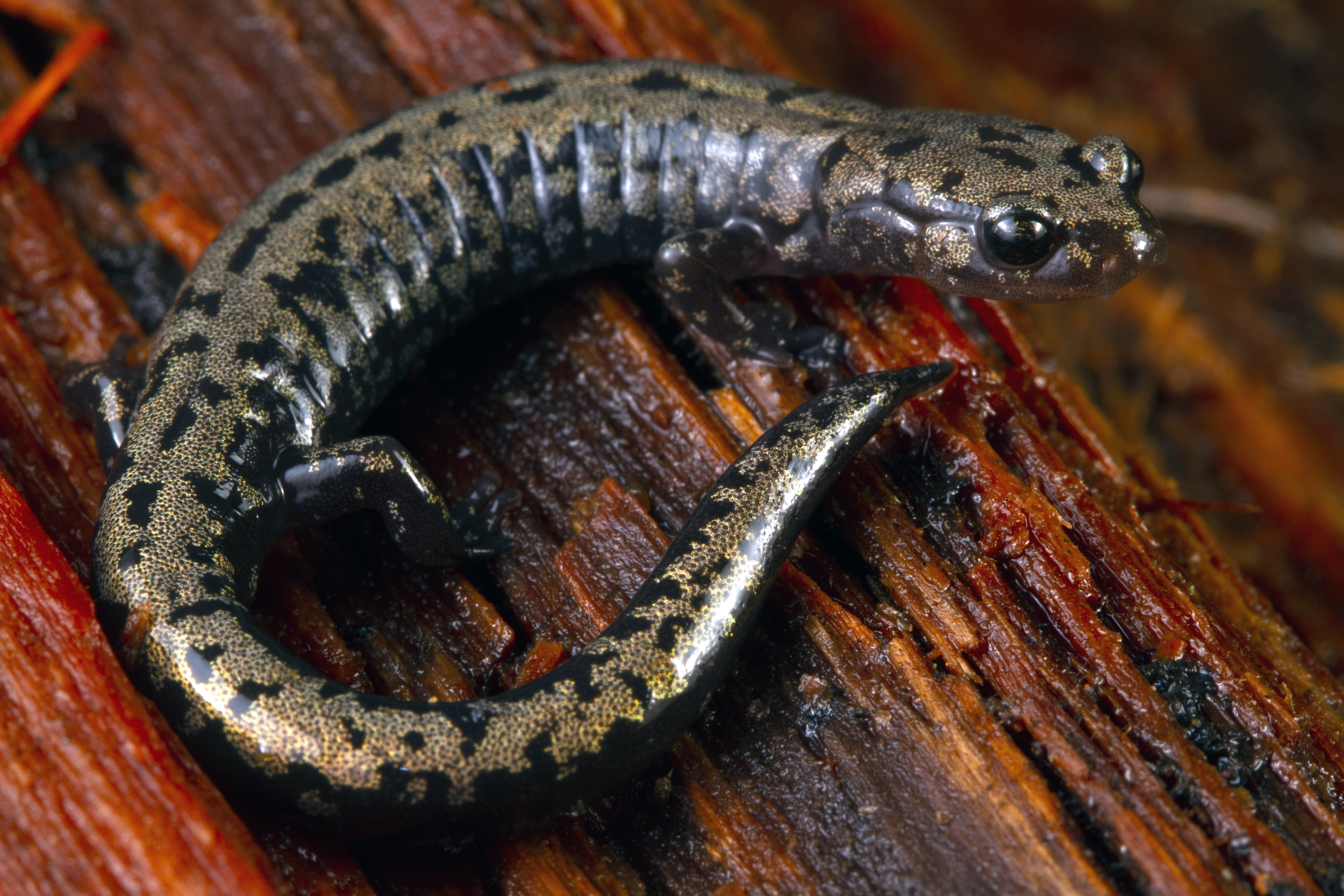
Weller's salamander

== Specimens ==
In April 1930, he visited Cascade Caverns in Kentucky with Dury, where he collected the type specimen of a salamander he described and named after Dury, Gyrinophilus porphyriticus duryi (Weller, 1930). During the summer vacation between his sophomore and junior years at Walnut Hills High School, he visited Grandfather Mountain in North Carolina with Dury, where he discovered the first specimens of Weller's salamander (Plethodon welleri).

== Death ==
A week after Weller graduated with high honors from high school, Dury took members of the Junior Society to Grandfather Mountain to find more specimens for Weller. The afternoon they arrived, Weller left the others to go collecting, despite the bad weather, and never returned. Four days later, his body was found wedged between boulders in a creek below the mountain. Weller was discovered with a collecting bag which contained specimens of his new species.

== Publications ==
- Walker, Charles F., and Weller, W. Hamilton (1932). "The Identity and Status of Pseudotriton duryi ". Copeia 1932 (2): 81–83. (Published by the American Society of Ichthyologists and Herpetologists).
- Weller, W.H. (1930). "Notes on amphibians collected in Carter Co., Kentucky". Proceedings of the Junior Society of Natural Sciences, Cincinnati 1 (5/6): 6–9. (counted).
- Weller, W.H. (1930). "On a recent occurrence of the blue-tailed skink in Hamilton County (Ohio)". Proc. Jun. Soc. Nat. Sci., Cincinnati 1 (5/6): [page numbers needed].
- Weller, W.H. (1930). "Notes on Aneides aeneus (Cope and Packard)". Proc. Jun. Soc. Nat. Sci., Cincinnati 1 (2): [?-?].
- Weller, W.H. (1930). "A preliminary list of the salamanders of the Great Smoky Mountains of North Carolina and Tennessee". Proc. Jun. Soc. Nat. Sci., Cincinnati 1 (2): [?-?].
