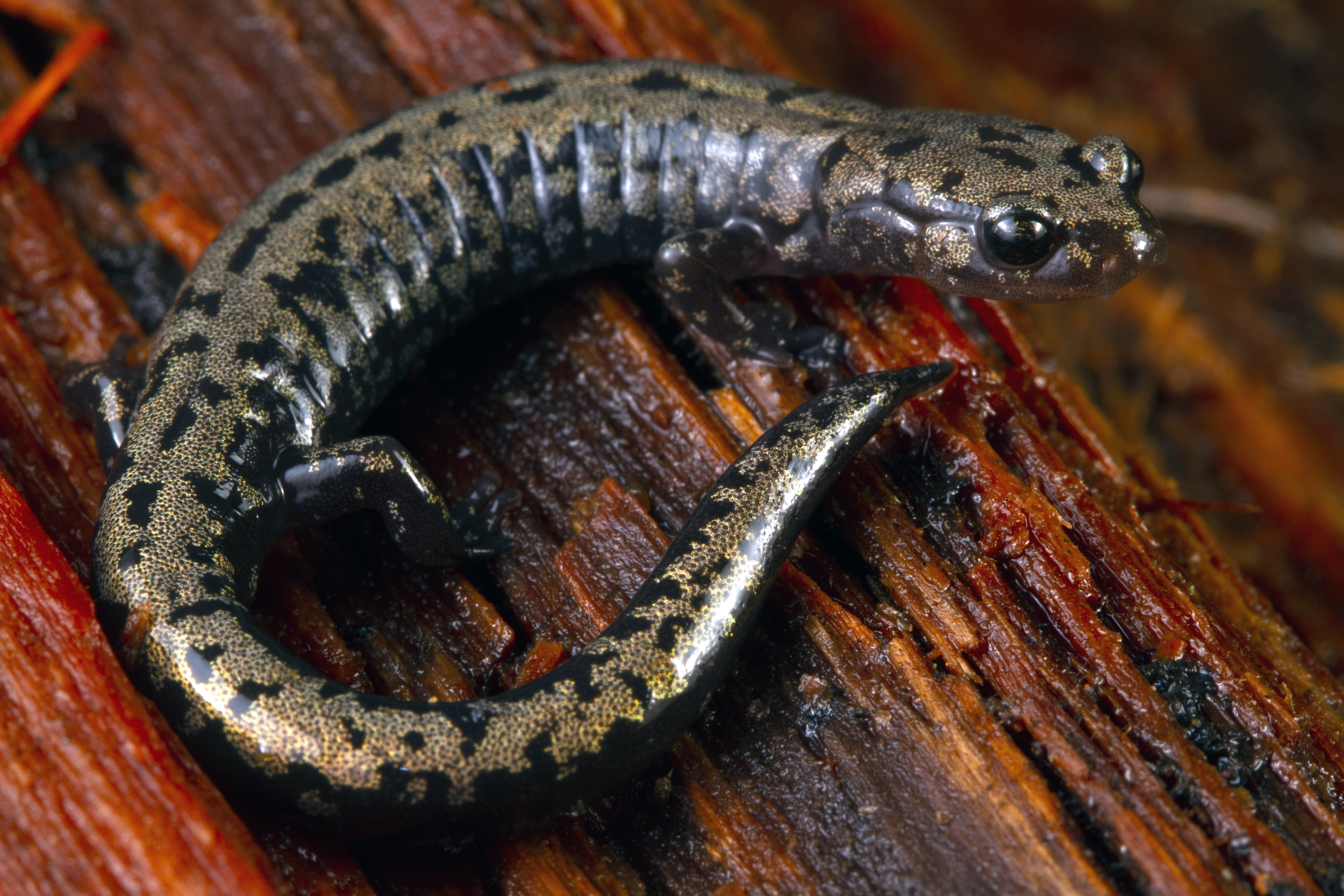
- Weller's salamander (Plethodon welleri)

Conservation status
- Endangered (IUCN 3.1)

Scientific classification
- Kingdom: Animalia
- Phylum: Chordata
- Class: Amphibia
- Order: Urodela
- Family: Plethodontidae
- Genus: Plethodon
- Species: P. welleri

Binomial name
- Plethodon welleri Walker, 1931

= Weller's salamander =

Species of amphibian

Weller's salamander (Plethodon welleri) is a species of salamander in the family Plethodontidae. This species in endemic to the southeastern mountain range of the United States. It is mainly found in North Carolina near Grandfather Mountain. The salamanders have a unique metallic spotting which distinguishes them from other Plethodon species and other salamanders in the area. They mainly inhabit cool forests with rocky areas.

Worth Hamilton Weller, an American herpetologist, discovered the new species during his sophomore/junior high school summer vacation in 1931.

This species is currently threatened by population fragmentation, habitat degradation and loss.

== Description ==
Weller's salamander has 16 coastal or costal grooves with light dorsal markings. The markings are usually dark gold in color with a metallic sheen. These are smaller salamanders, like most plethodontids, and have a slender body. They have 17 trunk vertebrae, which makes them the shortest of the eastern small plethodontids, and two to seven vomerin teeth that are located in series. These salamanders also have webbed toes. Males and females have differing visible genitalia for sex differentiation. Females have a simple slit, while males have a cloacal gland and papillae in the vent.

== Diet ==
They are insectivores that feed on insects, including pseudoscorpions, orb-weaver spiders, ticks and mites, springtails, true bugs, butterflies and moths, flies, and beetles.

== Defense ==
Like other plethodontids, Weller's salamander produces a noxious skin secretion when threatened and sometimes goes immobile to convince a predator that the individual is already dead.

== Habitat ==
This species of plethodon salamander is a high-altitude species found in the southern Blue Ridge Mountains. Their range includes northwest North Carolina and portions of Tennessee and Virginia into which the mountains extend. However, these salamanders are restricted to a few counties in the mentioned states. The counties include Johnson and Unicoi Counties in Tennessee and Yancey County in North Carolina. The salamanders inhabit mountain areas, including Mt. Rodgers and the Whitetop Mountains in southwest Virginia, as well as the Unaka Mountain ridges in northeastern Tennessee and eastern North Carolina. These plethodons are found mainly in the highland areas around this mountain ridge.

They inhabit spruce and birch forests that are heavily shaded. Some individuals were found in upper-level hardwood forests. The salamanders prefer habitats with cooler temperatures. These salamanders are generally found under logs, stones, and flat rocks in their preferred habitats.

== Reproduction ==
Weller's salamanders breed during the spring and fall. Courtship behaviors have been observed in captivity in October and April. The females are reproductively mature at 35 mm in length and tend to be older than 3 years when they become mature. The males can breed around 30 mm long at about 2–3 years old. The females lay eggs in clutches of four to 11 eggs in tight clusters suspended by a stalk. These nests are found under the moss mats that cover conifer logs. The eggs are seen between mid-August to September and are between 2.6 and 6.5 mm in diameter. The offspring show direct development with little to no evidence of gills being visible once the egg has hatched. Some evidence indicates the females brood or guard the eggs. The females found at these nests were undernourished, which indicates they do not feed during their time guarding the eggs. The eggs laid by the females are dark in color due to pigmentation by melanophores.

== Conservation ==
Larger populations of these salamanders appear to be stable. The populations are found on Grandfather Mountain and Rodgers Mountain. North Carolina and Virginia populations are believed to be declining. The current populations are isolated from each other, causing fragmentation to become a threat to these populations. The high altitude of the habitat helps protect the populations to some degree. Much of the salamander's range on Mount Rodgers is a national recreation area, and most of the land within the park is protected. The area around Grandfather Mountain is privately owned, but seems to be under stable protection. The populations of these salamanders are very isolated and the small number of individuals in each population makes those populations susceptible to extinction due to catastrophic events such as fires or more habitat degradation.

The major threat to this species is habitat degradation and loss, mainly due to development and logging practices.

== See also ==
- List of endangered animal species
