= Helen Iglauer Glueck =

American physician

Helen Iglauer Glueck (1907–1995) was an American physician known for her research in blood chemistry that linked bleeding disorders in newborns with a lack of Vitamin K in breast milk.

Glueck graduated from Walnut Hills High School in Cincinnati, Ohio in 1925. She obtained her BA from the University of Wisconsin–Madison and her MD from the University of Cincinnati College of Medicine.

She directed the University of Cincinnati Student Health Services (1945-1959) and then became Director of the Coagulation Laboratory at the University.

Wife of Nelson Glueck.

== Honors ==
- 1979 YWCA Career Woman of the Year
- 1985 Hebrew Union College Founders Medal
- 1985 University of Cincinnati College of Medicine Daniel Drake Award
- 1993 named a "Great Living Cincinnatian" by the Cincinnati Chamber of Commerce
