= Easy-Bake Oven =

Toy oven

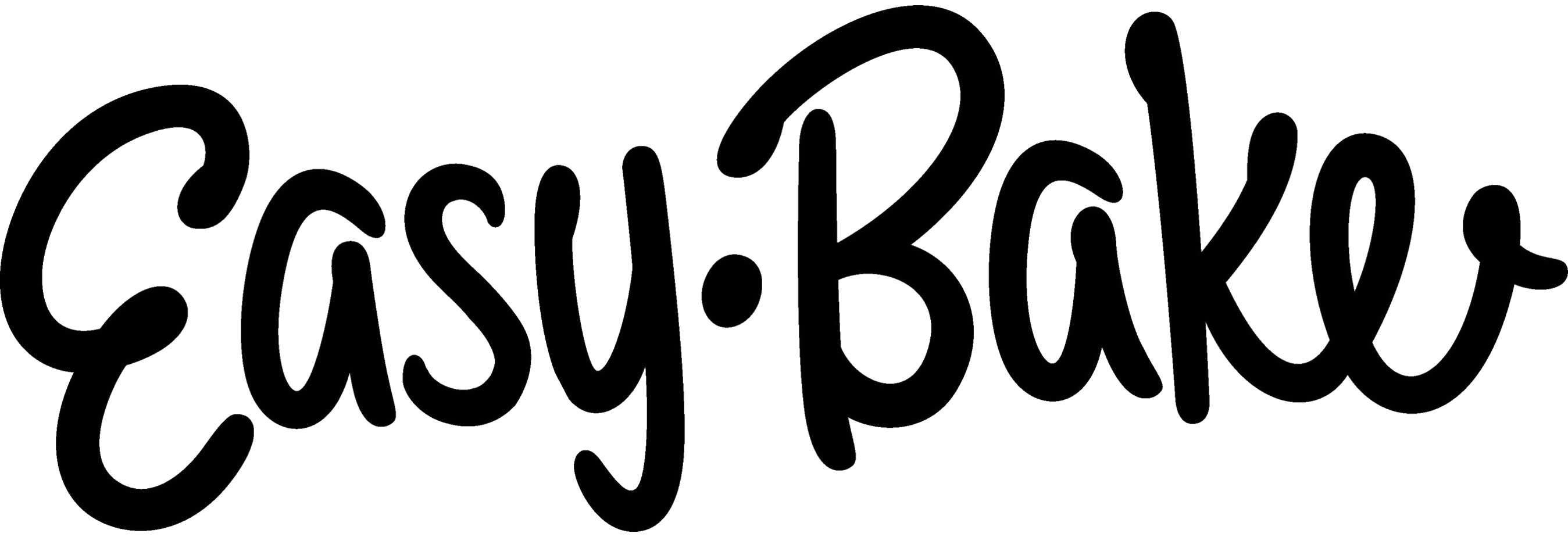
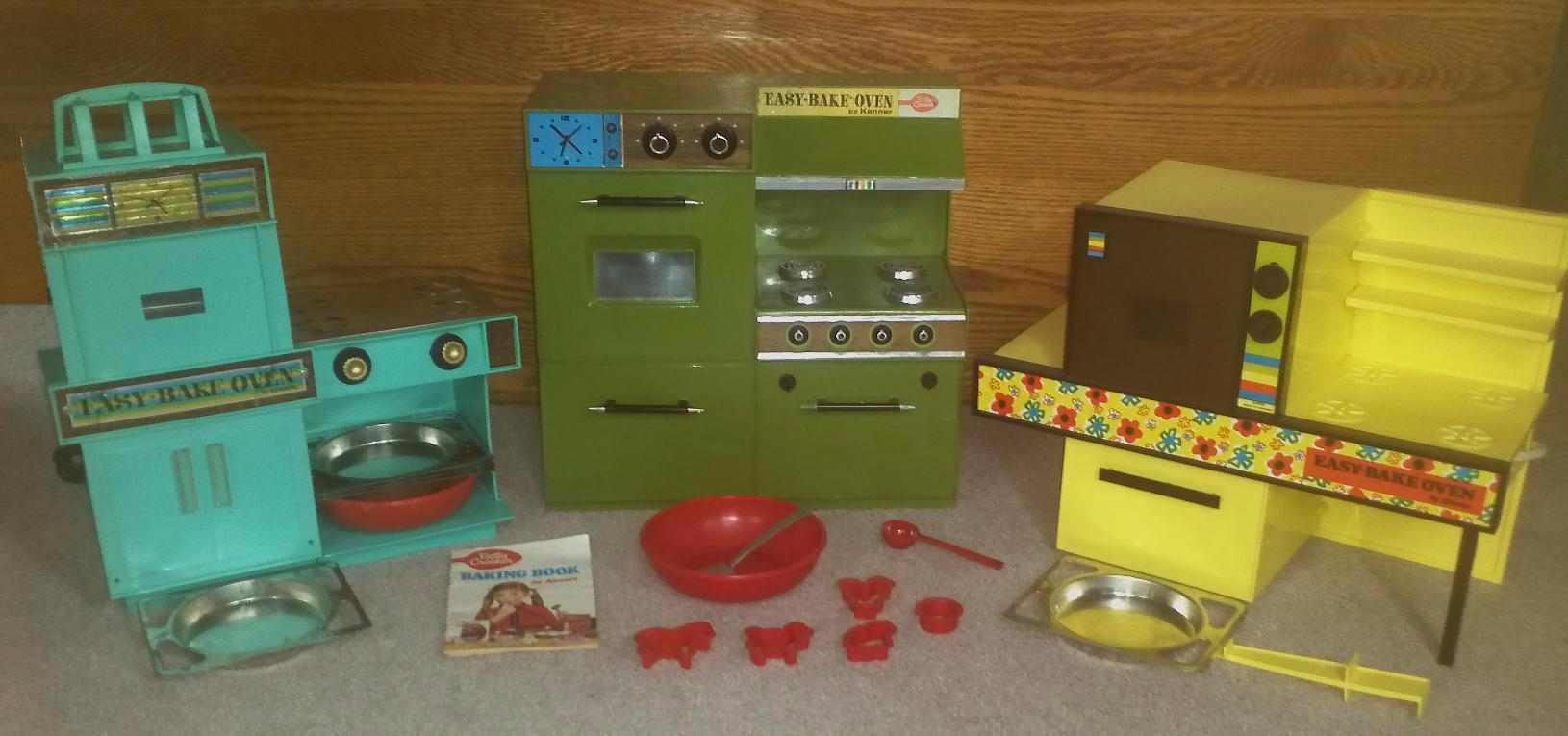
- The first three versions of the Easy-Bake Oven, starting with the Regular model (1963, left), the Premier (1969, middle), and the Mod (1971).
- Other names: Queasy Bake Cookerator
- Type: Toy oven
- Invented by: Ronald Howes
- Company: Kenner (1963–1991); Hasbro (1991-present); Just Play (2025-present)
- Country: United States
- Availability: 1963–present
- Materials: Incandescent light bulbs
- Features: A rectangular cooking pan, a pan tool, and instructions
- Slogan: "Bake your cake and eat it too!"
- Official website

The Easy-Bake Oven is a working toy oven introduced in 1963 and manufactured by Kenner and later by Hasbro. The original toy used a pair of ordinary incandescent light bulbs as a heat source; current versions use a true heating element. Kenner sold 500,000 Easy-Bake Ovens in the first year of production. By 1997, more than 16 million Easy-Bake Ovens had been sold.

The oven comes with packets of cake mix and small round pans. Additional mixes can be purchased separately. After water is added to the mix in the pan, it is pushed into the oven through a slot. After cooking, the cake is pushed out through a slot in the other end.

== History ==
=== Background ===
Miniature stoves and ovens had existed in the late 19th to early 20th century, with many being copies of full-size stoves. To appeal to girls, toy train-maker Lionel Corporation released a toy stove with two electric burners and a working oven in 1930. During the 1950s, various toy ovens with fiberglass insulation were marketed to families with children.

=== Kenner versions ===
The Easy-Bake Oven was introduced in 1963 by Kenner Products, a Cincinnati, Ohio-based toy company. The idea for the Easy-Bake Oven came from Norman Shapiro, Kenner's sales manager in New York. He was inspired by the ovens that New York street vendors used to bake pretzels, and suggested to Kenner executives that the company make a toy version of the appliance. Spearheaded by research and development vice-president James Kuhn, with major contributions from Ronald Howes, the Kenner team iterated on the idea. The original Kenner Easy-Bake Oven was heated by two 100-watt incandescent light bulbs, one above the food tray and one below. The idea was that the cake would bake more quickly and evenly if heated from both sides. Later models used only one bulb, leveraging convection from better interior heating dynamics to achieve the same results.

The original oven came in a pale yellow or turquoise, and was designed to resemble a conventional oven. The design changed many times over the years. An updated "Premier" model, available in avocado green (a common shade for kitchen appliances at the time, now almost a cultural cliché) or red, was released in 1969, followed by a "Mod" model in yellow or light green in 1971. A more recent model resembled a microwave oven.

A one-of-a-kind model was presented to the winner of the 5,000,000th Easy-Bake Oven Sweepstakes in 1972.

Kenner licensed the Easy-Bake Oven to international markets. Japan represented a significant opportunity for Kenner. The toy oven was licensed to Nakajima Corporation, which sold its version as Margaret's Cooking Oven.

=== Hasbro versions ===
After Kenner became a division of Hasbro, which then closed it down, Hasbro continued to produce the oven. The Easy-Bake Oven and Snack Center was introduced in 1993.

A decade after the Easy-Bake Oven and Snack Center was introduced, the Real Meal Oven was released. This oven was different from the others in being able to cook larger portions, and two of them at once, using two pans at the same time. It won the 2003 Best Toy Parenting magazine Toy of the Year Award. The neutral colors were more accepted across gender lines, and were favored by parents, particularly in the midst of queries and complaints over versions not being offered for male children. The Real Meal pans were larger than the Easy-Bake ones, and it could bake both desserts and main courses. This model featured a heating element and did not require a light bulb.

In 2002, Hasbro released the Queasy Bake Cookerator, a variant on the Easy-Bake targeted at young boys.

In 2006, a different version of the Easy-Bake was released, with a stove-top warmer and a heating element. Like Hasbro's first version, it had smaller pans, and it could only bake one pan at a time. But the new front-loading Hasbro design, a substantial departure from the traditional push-through arrangement, was ill-conceived, as all (approximately 985,000) such units were recalled over safety concerns and reported injuries.

The oven was inducted into the National Toy Hall of Fame in 2006.

In 2011, the last version to use a 100-watt incandescent light bulb was replaced by a new version with a dedicated heating element, named the Easy-Bake Ultimate Oven. The replacement was due to the availability of alternatives to the incandescent light bulbs that heated previous versions of the Easy-Bake Oven. It was feared that newer lamp requirements would render all models that used light bulbs as their heating elements obsolete because lamps would no longer be available. (The company never provided initial or replacement bulbs.)

In 2012, Hasbro announced the premiere of a version of the Easy-Bake Oven in black and silver after executives met with McKenna Pope, a girl from Garfield, New Jersey, who had started a Change.org petition asking the toy maker to offer the product in gender-neutral packaging. The prototype Easy-Bake Oven was also made available in blue. The redesigned product was slated to be unveiled in February 2013, at the New York Toy Fair.

== Marketing ==
In 1962, Kenner created the Gooney Bird as part of its marketing efforts. The new corporate mascot was primarily used as part of the company logo, appearing on most product packaging along with the company slogan, "It's Kenner, It's Fun!". The bird was also used in trade publications and advertisements with the tagline, "This bird means business!".

In 1968, Kenner approached Muppet creator Jim Henson to create a Muppet version of the Gooney Bird. The bird appeared in Easy-Bake Oven commercials with child actress Barbara Price. The Gooney Bird became so popular that Henson refurbished the character as Little Bird, Big Bird's smaller counterpart, in early seasons of Sesame Street.

== Recall ==
After a release of a new model in May 2006, Hasbro received reports of 29 children getting their hands or fingers caught in the front-loading door, including 5 reports of burns. In February 2007, Hasbro and the Consumer Product Safety Commission issued a voluntary recall of the oven and advised parents to stop using the oven with children under the age of 8 and contact the company for a free retrofit kit. The kit was approved by the CPSC and consisted of a plastic grate that fit over the existing oven door. The grate allowed the oven to function as designed, but it now provided an additional barrier to keep small fingers out.

Despite the retrofit program, the problems persisted. According to data from the CPSC, an additional 249 reported incidents included 77 burns, 16 of which were second- or third-degree in nature. On July 19, 2007, Hasbro re-issued its voluntary recall of the Easy-Bake after learning that part of a five-year-old girl's finger had to be amputated because of a severe burn. The recall affected 985,000 ovens that had been sold between May 2006 and July 2007. Ovens sold prior to May 2006 were not part of the recall, leaving more than 25 million side-entry/light bulb models in circulation unaffected.

== Legacy ==
National Easy-Bake Oven Day is observed annually on November 4, the day in which the toy oven was originally released in 1963. The National Day was established in 2017 by author and toy historian Todd Coopee.

== See also ==
- 2007 Chinese export recalls
