= Caroline Black (botanist) =

American botanist (1887–1930)

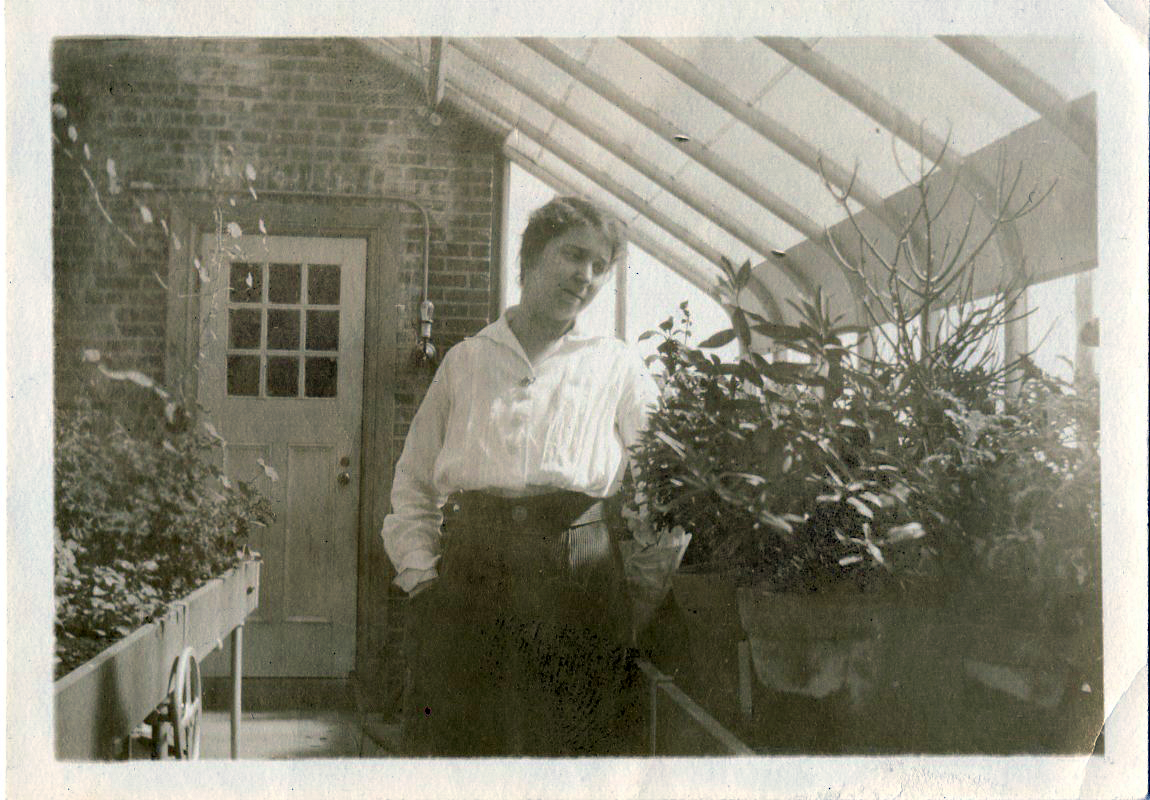
Caroline Black in the Connecticut College greenhouse, 1917

Caroline Black (January 28, 1887 – January 19, 1930) was an American botanist. Educated at Indiana University, she later taught at the University of New Hampshire and became the first chairperson of the Connecticut College botany department. Black was a founding member of the New London Garden Club. Following her death in 1930, the Connecticut College Board of Trustees named the Caroline Black Garden in her honor.

== Early life and education ==
Caroline A. Black was born in Syracuse, New York, on January 28, 1887, to Robert Watts Black (b. 1850 Ontario, Canada d. 1894/5) and Kate Eleanor Knott (b. London, England). Her older siblings Kathleen (Pohlman) and Robert were born in Canada. Caroline and her younger sister Eleanor (Mitchell) were born in the United States. She was a graduate of Walnut Hills High School in Cincinnati, Ohio. She received her B.A. in 1908, M.A. in 1909 and Ph.D. in 1912 at Indiana University Bloomington. Black taught Elementary Botany: A Study of the Fern and Pine, during the 1910 summer term at Indiana University.

== Career ==
Caroline Black joined the University of New Hampshire as an assistant professor of botany in 1911. She was the first female professor at UNH and the first woman on the staff of the New Hampshire Agricultural Experiment Station.

Caroline Black accepted the position of assistant professor of botany in the biology department at Connecticut College in New London in 1917. However, she was not entirely satisfied with the proposal and suggested that the college split biology into separate departments of botany and zoology.

In 1928 a botanical garden was started on the east side of Mohegan Avenue. In keeping with Professor Black's stance that the campus grounds be an extension of the botany department, the botanical garden served as an outdoor classroom for botany students. Caroline Black collected examples of Connecticut plants for the garden.

== Works ==
- Black, Caroline (October 1909). "The development of the imbedded antheridium in Dryopteris stipularis (Willd.) [wood fern] Maxon and "Nephrodium molle"". Bulletin of the Torrey Botanical Club. 36 (10): 557–571. doi:10.2307/2479051. JSTOR 2479051.
- Black, Caroline (1912). "Apple Spot and Quince Blotch". Phytopathology. 2: 62–72.
- Black, Caroline (1 July 1913). "Morphology of Riccia frostii [liverwort]". Annals of Botany. 27 (3): 511–532. doi:10.1093/oxfordjournals.aob.a089472.
- Black, Caroline (1 December 1914). "Branched Cells in the Prothallium of Onoclea sensibilis L." Bulletin of the Torrey Botanical Club. 41 (12): 617–620. doi:10.2307/2479542. JSTOR 2479542.
- Black, Caroline (1916). "The Nature of the Inflorescence and Fruit of Pyrus Malus". Memoirs of the N. Y. Botanical Garden. 6: 519–547.
- Black, Caroline (1 October 1926). "The Use of Plasticine Models in Teaching Mitosis". Science. 64 (1657): 333. Bibcode:1926Sci....64..333B. doi:10.1126/science.64.1657.333. PMID 17730957.
- Black, Caroline (1 January 1930). Dehiscent Fruits in the Strawberry. Des Moines Meeting of Botanical Society of America.

== Death ==
While traveling after presenting a paper in Des Moines, Caroline Black contracted spinal meningitis. Two weeks later she died at her brother's home in Cincinnati. On February 6, 1930, the Connecticut College Board of Trustees voted to name the botanical garden in her memory, the Caroline Black Garden.

== Legacy ==
In the 1930s, the New London Garden Club and the New London Horticultural Society raised $500 for a memorial pool and additional plantings, as well as the bronze plaque on a boulder near the pool.

In 1999, the Smithsonian Institution included the Caroline Black Garden in its national Archives of American Gardens.

In 2001, it was accepted as part of the Gardens for Peace Network, recognizing the unique "sense of place" that characterizes the Caroline Black Garden.
