= Ronald Howes =

American inventor

Ronald B. Howes Sr.
- Born: May 22, 1926
- Died: February 16, 2010 (aged 83); Anderson Township, OH
- Occupation: Inventor
- Known for: Inventor of the Easy-Bake Oven

Ronald B. Howes (May 22, 1926 – February 16, 2010) was an American toy inventor, best known for his invention of the Easy-Bake Oven, which was introduced to consumers in 1963.

== Biography ==
=== Early life ===
Howes' mother died when he was born. He was raised by his German grandmother and her American husband in Over-the-Rhine, a historic neighborhood in Cincinnati. Howes' family ran a series of small grocery stores in the city during the Great Depression.

Howes taught himself to read before kindergarten. He left Walnut Hills High School during World War II in order to enlist in the United States Navy. He served in the South Pacific during the war before returning to Cincinnati.

He earned his bachelor's degree from the University of Cincinnati, where he had already earned some credits while in high school.

=== Inventions ===
Howes came up with the idea for the Easy-Bake Oven when he noticed that street vendors kept their food hot by using heat-lamps. In addition to his creation of the Easy-Bake Oven, Howes also was involved in the creation of or refinement to a number of other Kenner Toy products, including Spirograph, Give-a-Show Projector, and Close-and-Play Record Player. Howes died on February 16, 2010, at the age of 83.
