= Harvest gold =

Shade of orange and yellow

Color coordinates
- Hex triplet: #DA9100
- sRGB^{B} (r, g, b): (218, 145, 0)
- HSV (h, s, v): (40°, 100%, 85%)
- CIELCh_{uv} (L, C, h): (66, 90, 47°)
- ISCC–NBS descriptor: Strong orange yellow
- B: Normalized to [0–255] (byte)

Harvest gold is a shade of orange and yellow. The first recorded use of harvest as a color name in English was in 1923. It was popular with kitchen and other appliances during the 1970s, along with brown, burnt orange, and avocado green.
