= Shades of chartreuse =

Varieties of the color chartreuse

Chartreuse

Color coordinates
- Hex triplet: #80FF00
- sRGB^{B} (r, g, b): (128, 255, 0)
- HSV (h, s, v): (90°, 100%, 100%)
- CIELCh_{uv} (L, C, h): (90, 123, 119°)
- Source: On the RGB color wheel, Chartreuse is defined as the color halfway between yellow and green.
- ISCC–NBS descriptor: Vivid yellowish green
- B: Normalized to [0–255] (byte)

Shades of chartreuse are listed below. Chartreuse is a color between yellow and green, so named because of its resemblance to the color of the French liqueur green chartreuse.

== Definitions of chartreuse ==
=== Chartreuse (web color) ===
Chartreuse (web color)
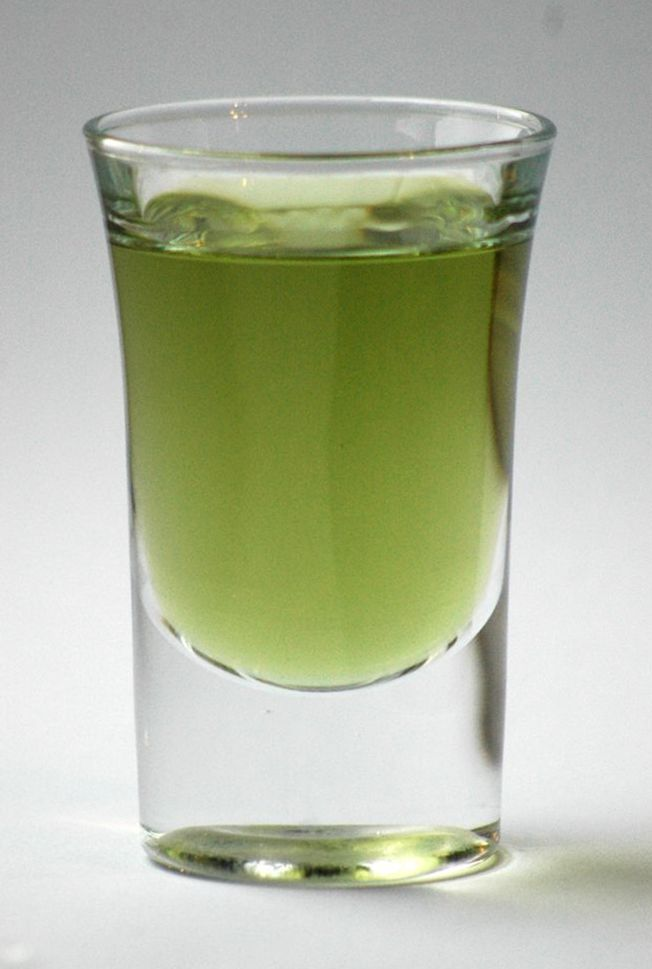
- Green Chartreuse liqueur

Color coordinates
- Hex triplet: #7FFF00
- sRGB^{B} (r, g, b): (127, 255, 0)
- HSV (h, s, v): (90°, 100%, 100%)
- CIELCh_{uv} (L, C, h): (90, 123, 120°)
- Source: X11
- ISCC–NBS descriptor: Vivid yellowish green
- B: Normalized to [0–255] (byte)

Chartreuse green was codified to refer to this brighter color when the X11 colors were formulated in 1987; by the early 1990s, they became known as the X11 web colors. The web color chartreuse is the color precisely halfway between green and yellow, so it is 50% green and 50% yellow. It is one of the tertiary colors of the HSV color wheel, also known as the RGB color wheel. Another name for this color is chartreuse green.

The term chartreuse is defined by the Oxford English Dictionary as: "A shade of color; a pale apple-green". The dictionary gives a quotation in the British publication Western Daily Press (26 Dec. 1884) Vol. 7 No. 5 as being the earliest occurrence found in print of the term 'chartreuse' used as the name of a color. However the source does not define or describe the color referred to.

"Chartreuse Green" is also listed in Plochere Color System (1948).

In Color: Universal Language and Dictionary of Names (1976), "Chartreuse Green" is listed under "116. Brilliant Yellow Green".

In The Domestic Monthly (1885) is written, "The delicate, pale green, with a yellow tinge, entitled 'Chartreuse,' is a rival to the renewed apple green," and, "The new shade of Chartreuse green, from light to dark, is lovely in the large feather fans. ... Some of the corded silks have fancy stripes in a combination of colors such as ... mousse and Chartreuse, which is the stylish yellow green."

In The Ladies' Home Journal of May 1889, is written, "Chantilly cloaks come shaped like the old-fashioned rotonde, with collar of narrow lace, and are worn over a lining of chartreuse green or jonquil yellow."

In The Millinery Trade Review (1889) is written, "From Madame Catlin of Paris, a hat of velvet in moss-green of medium tone, or of strong Chartreuse-green."

In The Mineral Industry (1898) is written, "The characteristic twin colors of a few doubly refractive gems will prove of interest ... tourmaline green (chartreuse green and bluish green).

In Dry Goods Reporter (1905), it is noted under "Choosing an Easter Hat" — "Chartreuse greens are among the colors hardest of all to combine artistically, and yet with the new popular bluet are charming."

In Pure Products (1910) is written, "The following colors can be bought in powder form ... chartreuse green".

In a 1956 edition of Billboard, a jukebox is advertised as being available in "Delft blue, cherry red, embered charcoal, chartreuse green, bright sand, canary yellow, atoll coral and night-sky black."

In 1988, Margaret Walch, director of the Color Association of the United States is reported to have said, "The hottest color out there now is an ugly chartreuse green.... It suggests what we don't have: nature, youth, energy, growth."

=== Chartreuse (traditional) ===
Chartreuse (traditional)

Color coordinates
- Hex triplet: #DFFF00
- sRGB^{B} (r, g, b): (223, 255, 0)
- HSV (h, s, v): (68°, 100%, 100%)
- CIELCh_{uv} (L, C, h): (95, 108, 97°)
- Source: Maerz and Paul
- ISCC–NBS descriptor: Vivid greenish yellow
- B: Normalized to [0–255] (byte)

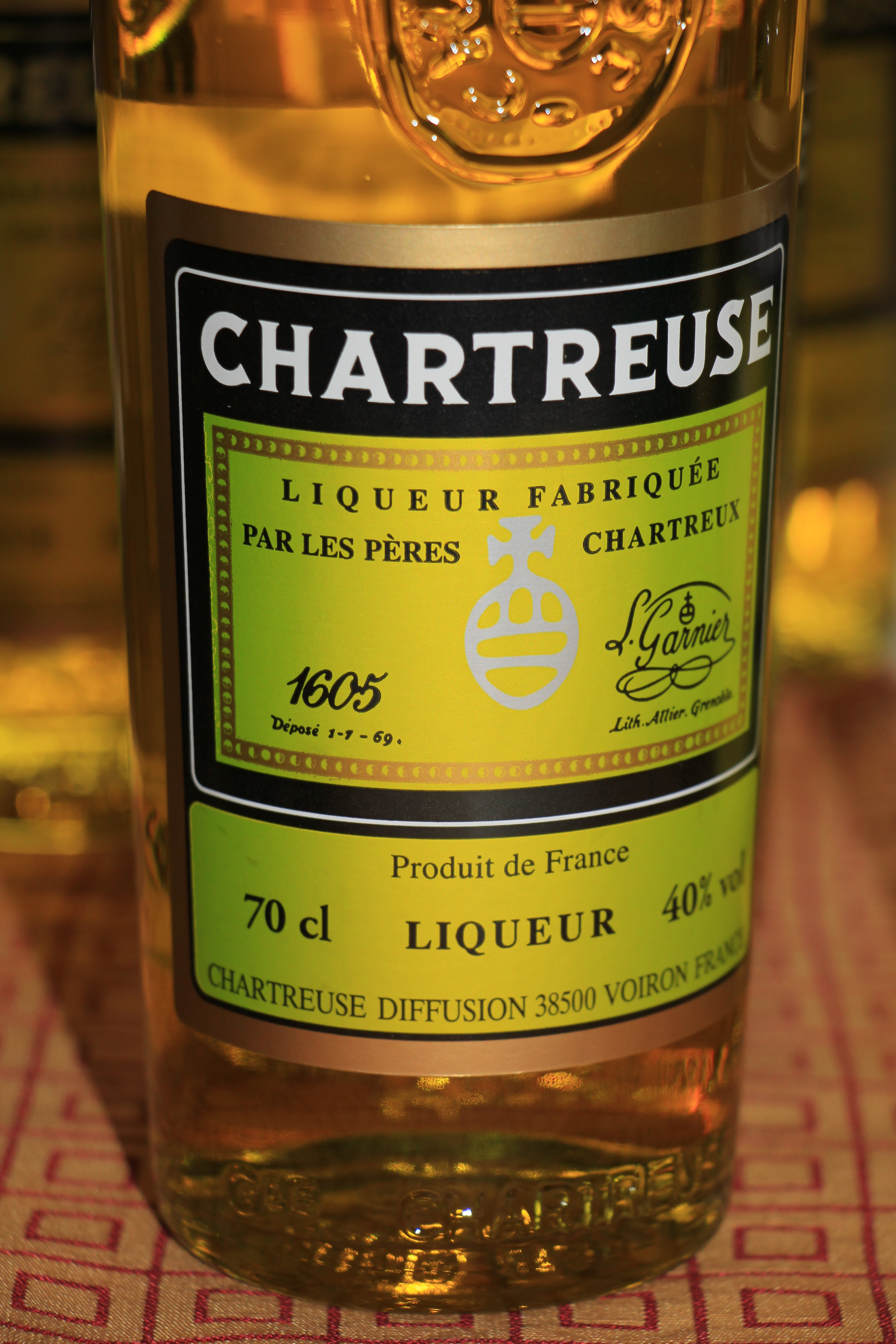
A bottle of chartreuse liqueur

The first recorded use of chartreuse for the color that is now called chartreuse yellow in American English was in 1892.

In the book Color Standards and Color Nomenclature (1912), "Chartreuse Yellow" is listed and illustrated.

== Variations of chartreuse ==
=== Lawn green ===
Lawn green

Color coordinates
- Hex triplet: #7CFC00
- sRGB^{B} (r, g, b): (124, 252, 0)
- HSV (h, s, v): (90°, 100%, 99%)
- CIELCh_{uv} (L, C, h): (89, 122, 120°)
- Source: CSS Color Module Level 3
- ISCC–NBS descriptor: Brilliant yellow green
- B: Normalized to [0–255] (byte)

=== Bright green ===
Bright green

Color coordinates
- Hex triplet: #66FF00
- sRGB^{B} (r, g, b): (102, 255, 0)
- HSV (h, s, v): (96°, 100%, 100%)
- CIELCh_{uv} (L, C, h): (89, 127, 123°)
- ISCC–NBS descriptor: Brilliant yellow green
- B: Normalized to [0–255] (byte)

=== Yellow-green ===
Yellow-green

Color coordinates
- Hex triplet: #9ACD32
- sRGB^{B} (r, g, b): (154, 205, 50)
- HSV (h, s, v): (80°, 76%, 80%)
- CIELCh_{uv} (L, C, h): (77, 86, 107°)
- Source: X11
- ISCC–NBS descriptor: Vivid yellow green
- B: Normalized to [0–255] (byte)

Yellow-green is a dull medium shade of chartreuse.

Before the X11 colors were formulated in 1987, the color term yellow-green was used to refer to the color that is now designated as the web color chartreuse (chartreuse green). Now, the term "yellow-green" is used to refer to this medium desaturated shade of chartreuse.

=== Green-yellow ===
Green-yellow
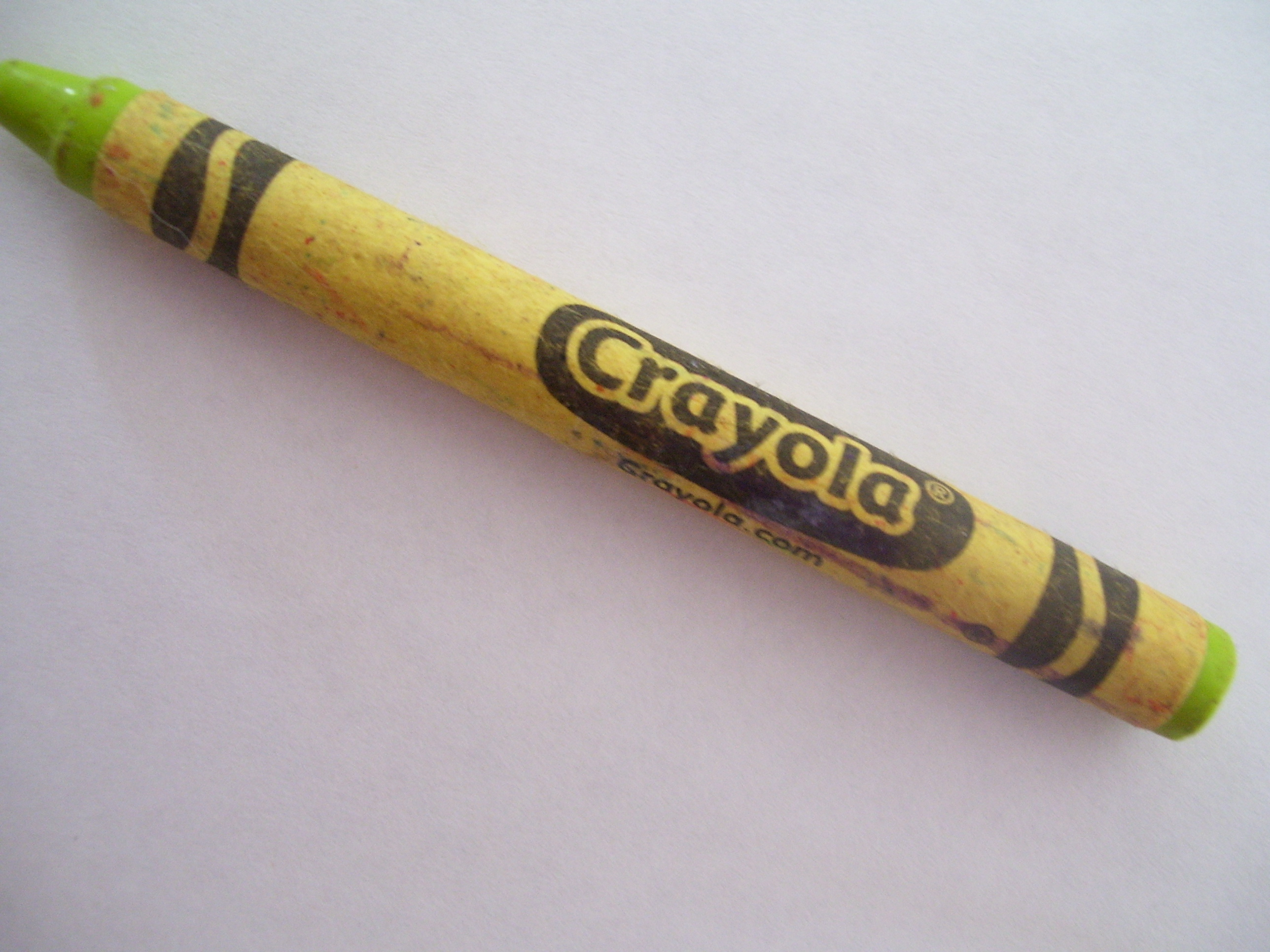
- A Crayola green-yellow crayon

Color coordinates
- Hex triplet: #ADFF2F
- sRGB^{B} (r, g, b): (173, 255, 47)
- HSV (h, s, v): (84°, 82%, 100%)
- CIELCh_{uv} (L, C, h): (92, 111, 112°)
- Source: X11
- ISCC–NBS descriptor: Vivid yellow green
- B: Normalized to [0–255] (byte)

Green-yellow is a mixture of the colors green and yellow. It is a web color. It is a light tint of chartreuse.

"Green-yellow" is an official Crayola crayon color which was formulated in 1958.

Green-yellow is near the center of the visible spectrum, and is very eye-catching. For this reason, many emergency vehicles and uniforms exhibit green-yellow.

=== Lime ===
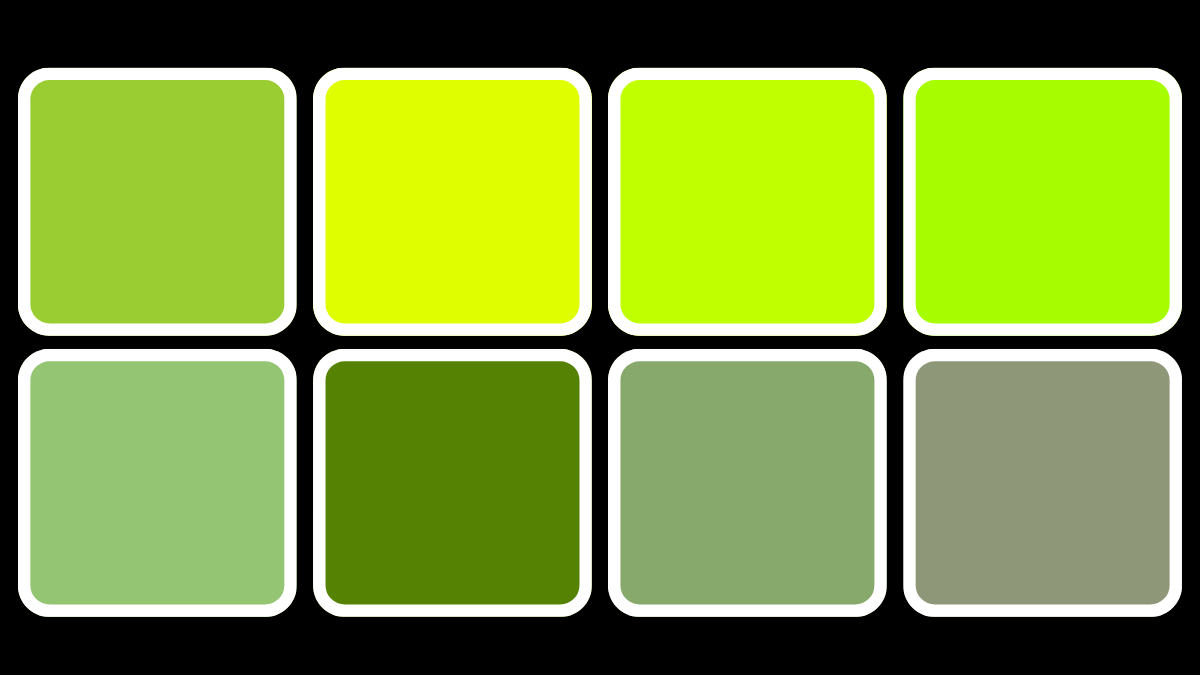

Lime
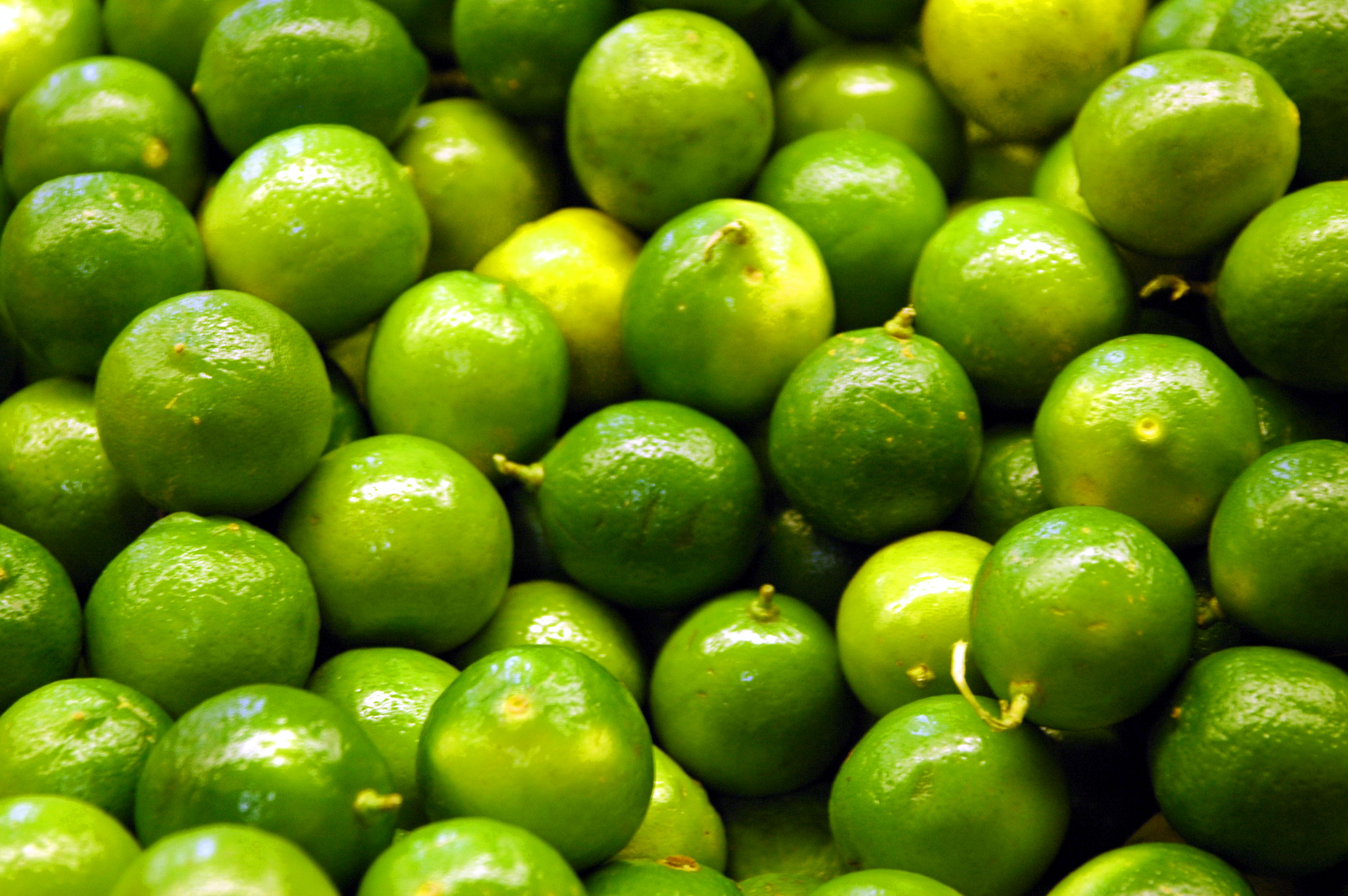
- Limes

Color coordinates
- Hex triplet: #BFFF00
- sRGB^{B} (r, g, b): (191, 255, 0)
- HSV (h, s, v): (75°, 100%, 100%)
- CIELCh_{uv} (L, C, h): (93, 111, 107°)
- Source: Maerz & Paul
- ISCC–NBS descriptor: Vivid yellow green
- B: Normalized to [0–255] (byte)

Lime is a color that is sometimes referred to as a representation of the color of the citrus fruit called limes. However, in its original form, it referred to the color of the samara fruits of the lime or linden tree (species in the genus Tilia).

The first recorded use of lime green as a color name in English was in 1890.

=== Spring bud ===
Spring bud

Color coordinates
- Hex triplet: #A7FC00
- sRGB^{B} (r, g, b): (167, 252, 0)
- HSV (h, s, v): (80°, 100%, 99%)
- CIELCh_{uv} (L, C, h): (91, 114, 112°)
- Source: Maerz and Paul
- ISCC–NBS descriptor: Vivid yellow green
- B: Normalized to [0–255] (byte)

Spring bud was the color that was traditionally called "spring green" before the web color spring green was formulated in 1987.

The first recorded use of spring green as a color name in English (meaning the color that is now called spring bud) was in 1766.

=== So sour ===
So sour

Color coordinates
- Hex triplet: #00ff11
- sRGB^{B} (r, g, b): (0, 255, 17)
- HSV (h, s, v): (124°, 100%, 100%)
- CIELCh_{uv} (L, C, h): (88, 135, 128°)
- Source: ColorKit
- ISCC–NBS descriptor: Highly saturated lime
- B: Normalized to [0–255] (byte)

So sour is a shade of lime.

=== Pistachio ===
Pistachio
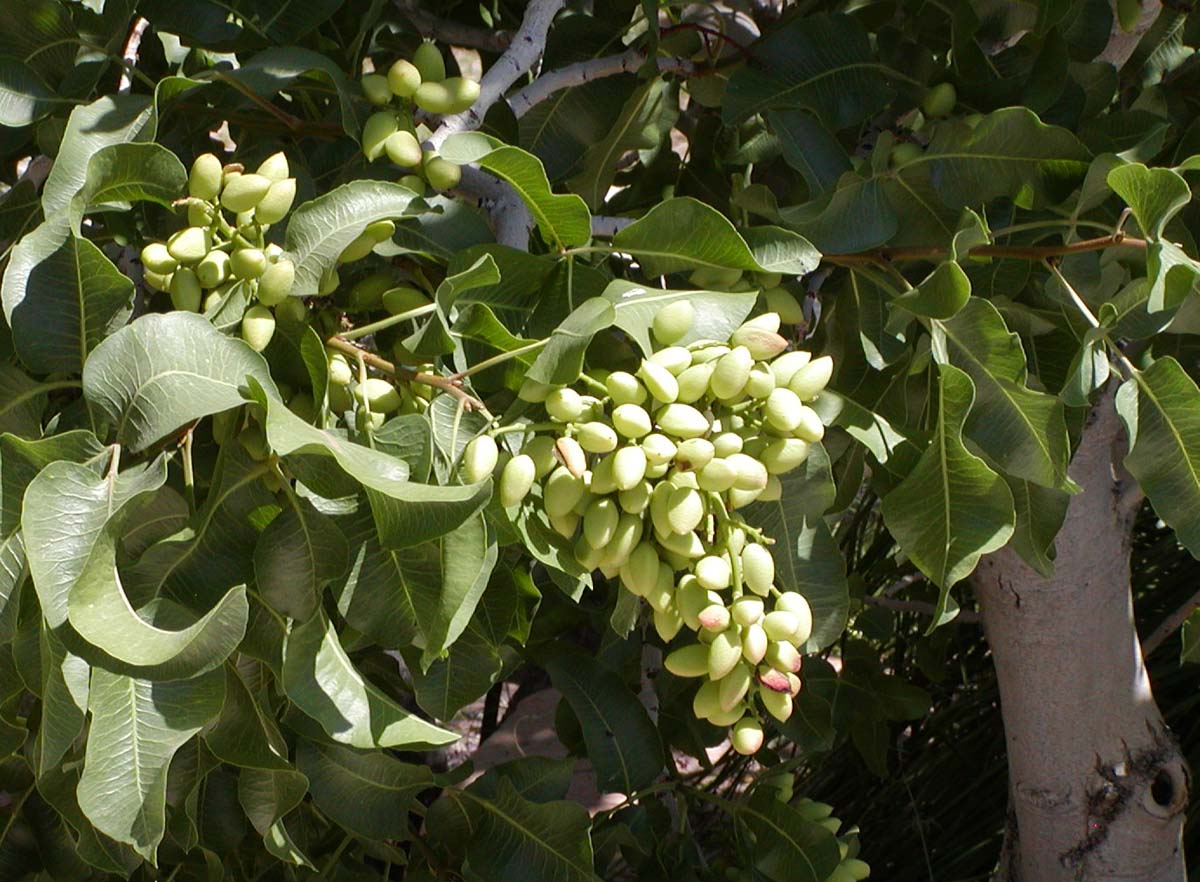
- Ripening pistachio culinary nuts

Color coordinates
- Hex triplet: #60FF00
- sRGB^{B} (r, g, b): (96, 255, 0)
- HSV (h, s, v): (97°, 100%, 100%)
- CIELCh_{uv} (L, C, h): (89, 128, 123°)
- Source: ISCC-NBS
- ISCC–NBS descriptor: Strong yellow green
- B: Normalized to [0–255] (byte)

Pistachio is a dull yellowish-green color resembling the pistachio nut.

=== Avocado ===
Avocado
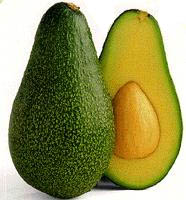
- An avocado

Color coordinates
- Hex triplet: #568203
- sRGB^{B} (r, g, b): (86, 130, 3)
- HSV (h, s, v): (81°, 98%, 51%)
- CIELCh_{uv} (L, C, h): (49, 61, 111°)
- Source: Pourpre.com
- ISCC–NBS descriptor: Deep yellow green
- B: Normalized to [0–255] (byte)

Avocado is a dark yellow-green color that is a representation of the color of the outer surface of an avocado. Avocado can be made by mixing equal amounts of yellow and grey paint or unequal amounts of yellow and black paint. Avocado, along with other earthy tones like harvest gold and burnt orange, was a common color for consumer goods like automobiles, shag carpets, and household appliances during the 1970s.

=== Asparagus ===
Asparagus
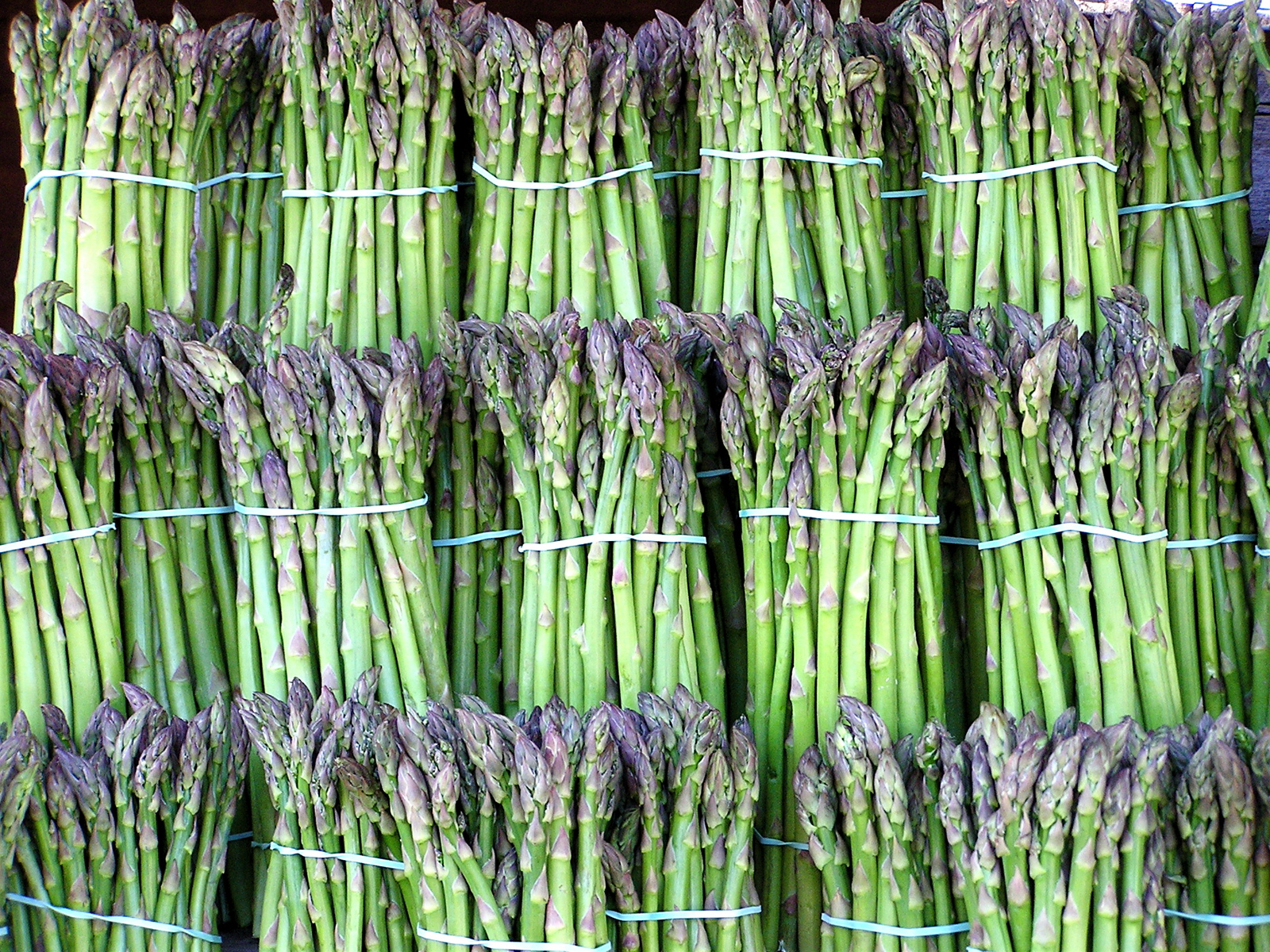
- Bundled stalks of asparagus

Color coordinates
- Hex triplet: #87A96B
- sRGB^{B} (r, g, b): (135, 169, 107)
- HSV (h, s, v): (93°, 37%, 66%)
- CIELCh_{uv} (L, C, h): (65, 44, 113°)
- Source: Crayola
- ISCC–NBS descriptor: Moderate yellow green
- B: Normalized to [0–255] (byte)

Asparagus is a tone of chartreuse that is named after the vegetable. Crayola created this color in 1993 as one of the 16 to be named in the Name the Color Contest.

It is also the color of a wild asparagus plant blowing in the wind of the 1949 classic film Sands of Iwo Jima.

Another name for this color is asparagus green. The first recorded use of "asparagus green" as a color name in English was in 1805.

=== Artichoke ===
Artichoke
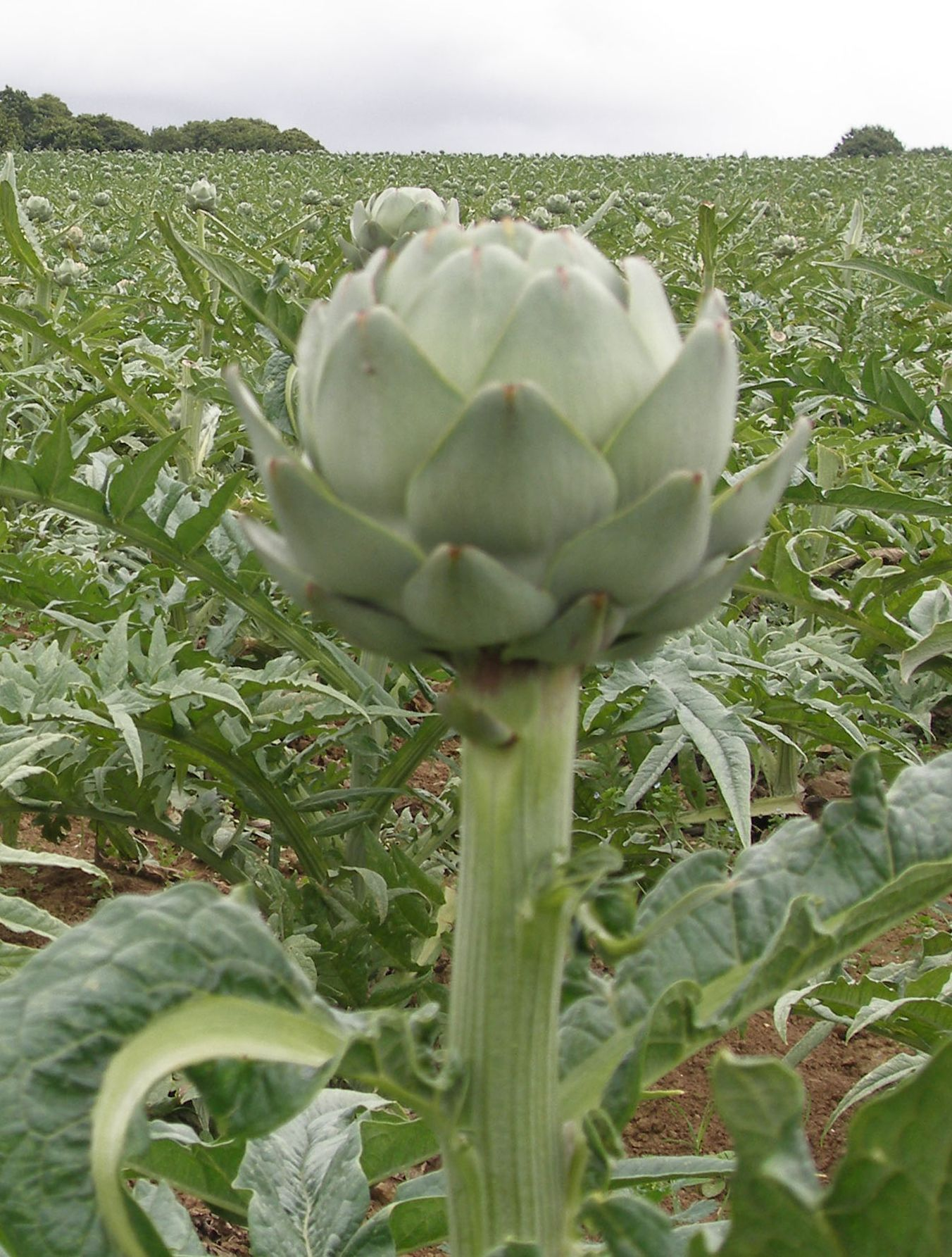
- An artichoke

Color coordinates
- Hex triplet: #8F9779
- sRGB^{B} (r, g, b): (143, 151, 121)
- HSV (h, s, v): (76°, 20%, 59%)
- CIELCh_{uv} (L, C, h): (61, 22, 98°)
- Source: ISCC-NBS
- ISCC–NBS descriptor: Moderate yellow green
- B: Normalized to [0–255] (byte)

Artichoke is a color that is a representation of the color of a raw fresh uncooked artichoke. Another name for this color is artichoke chartreuse or artichoke green.

The first recorded use of "artichoke green" as a color name in English was in 1905.

== See also ==
- Lime (color)
- List of colors
