= 1980s nostalgia =

Sentimentality for the 1980s

1980s nostalgia is nostalgia for certain aspects of the 1980s. 1980s nostalgia is a form of decade nostalgia. 1980s retro is retro related to the 1980s. 1980s revival is the revival of some aspect or aspects of the 1980s.

== Duration and geography ==
According to The New York Times, 1980s nostalgia has existed since the 1990s. Trend researchers reported that 1980s nostalgia had started by 1993, and The Washington Post reported the existence of a 1980s nostalgia wave in 1994. It has been said that the 1980s nostalgia in 1993 indicated that a twenty-year nostalgia cycle did not appear to apply. In 2010, music critic Simon Reynolds said the 2000s was the retro twin of the 1980s in some countries. It has been said that, if a twenty-year nostalgia cycle applied, then 1980s nostalgia would have ended circa 2010. In 2016, it was said that this had not happened, and that a twenty-year nostalgia cycle did not appear to apply. It has been said that, in 2010, there was an increase in 1980s nostalgia in the United States. A large increase in 1980s nostalgia was caused by Stranger Things. As of 2026, 1980s nostalgia continues. Chaney predicted that it will continue permanently.

In Japan, it has been said that the Shōwa retro boom that began in 2017 is centred on the 1980s.

In 2024, Zestanakis said 1980s nostalgia exists on a global scale.

== Demographics ==
According to a 2023 GWI poll, 66% of younger baby boomers, born between 1958 and 1963, had nostalgia for media from the 1980s in twelve markets. The same was true of 65% of Generation X born between 1964 and 1982.

=== Generation Z ===
Generation Z are nostalgic about the 1980s, in anglosphere countries and in Japan, even though they were born after the end of the 1980s. The same is true of members of Generation Y born after the 1980s in South Korea. Tom van Laer (University of Sydney) and Davide Christian Orazi (Monash University) described the effect of the television series Stranger Things on Generation Z as "pseudo nostalgia", but Charles Fairchild (University of Sydney) disputes that concept and label. In 2022, Spotify said that Generation Z are more nostalgic for the 1980s than for other decades.

== Media ==
=== Music ===
A 2010 Music Choice Europe survey of people in Europe found that the 1980s was the most popular decade for music, being the top preference of 31% of respondents. The proportion of Generation Z outside China who listen to 1980s music is 8% higher among TikTok users. Lost 80's Live is a 1980s nostalgia concert tour. The Cruel World Festival is a 1980s nostalgia music festival. There is nostalgia for the 1980s music of Michael Jackson and Whitney Houston. 1980s nostalgia music genres include synthwave, vaporwave, chillwave, sovietwave, the '80s remix and hypnagogic pop. There are 1980s nostalgia radio stations.

=== Video games ===
Showa American Story is a Chinese video game set that combines American 1980s nostalgia with Japanese Shōwa nostalgia, as seen from the perspective of a video game developer who encountered the pop culture of those countries as a child in 1980s China. Its trailers feature 1980s music from Warabe, and the first of those trailers went viral in 2022.

198X (2019) is a 1980s retro video game.

=== Literature ===
There are 1980s nostalgia novels.

=== Film ===
Nostalgia films about the 1980s include Sing Street (2016) and Call Me by Your Name (2017).

== Fashion ==
Some 1980s fashions have been revived in the 2010s and 2020s. 1980s fashions that have been revived include shoulder pads, power suits and 1980s makeup.

== Aesthetics and design ==
The designs of the Memphis Group have been revived. Revivals include 1980s interior design, glass bricks and typefaces.

== Toys ==
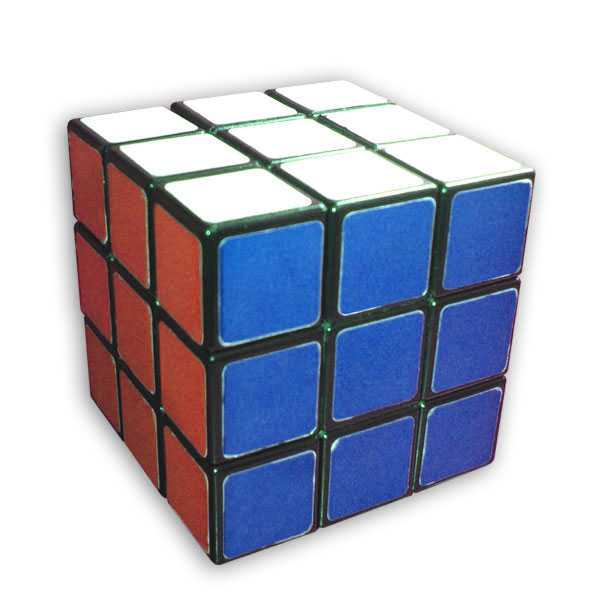
Rubik's Cube

There is nostalgia for the Rubik's Cube. Some 1980s toys have become collectibles, and some have become valuable.

== Asia ==
=== China ===
There is 1980s retro photography.

=== Hong Kong ===
There is nostalgia for 1980s Hong Kong films; for 1980s Hong Kong television programmes; and for 1980s Hong Kong cantopop. Twilight of the Warriors: Walled In (2024) is a 1980s nostalgia film.

=== India ===
There is nostalgia for The Ramayan and Rupa Biswas. There are 1980s nostalgia coffee table books.

=== Indonesia ===
There are collectors of 1980s pop music cassette tapes. There is nostalgia for 1980s Indonesian disco music; and for 1980s films such as Gengsi Dong, Ratu Ilmu Hitam and Catatan Si Boy. 1980s nostalgia concerts and music festivals have been held. The remake Gita Cinta dari SMA (2023) is a 1980s nostalgia film.

=== Israel ===
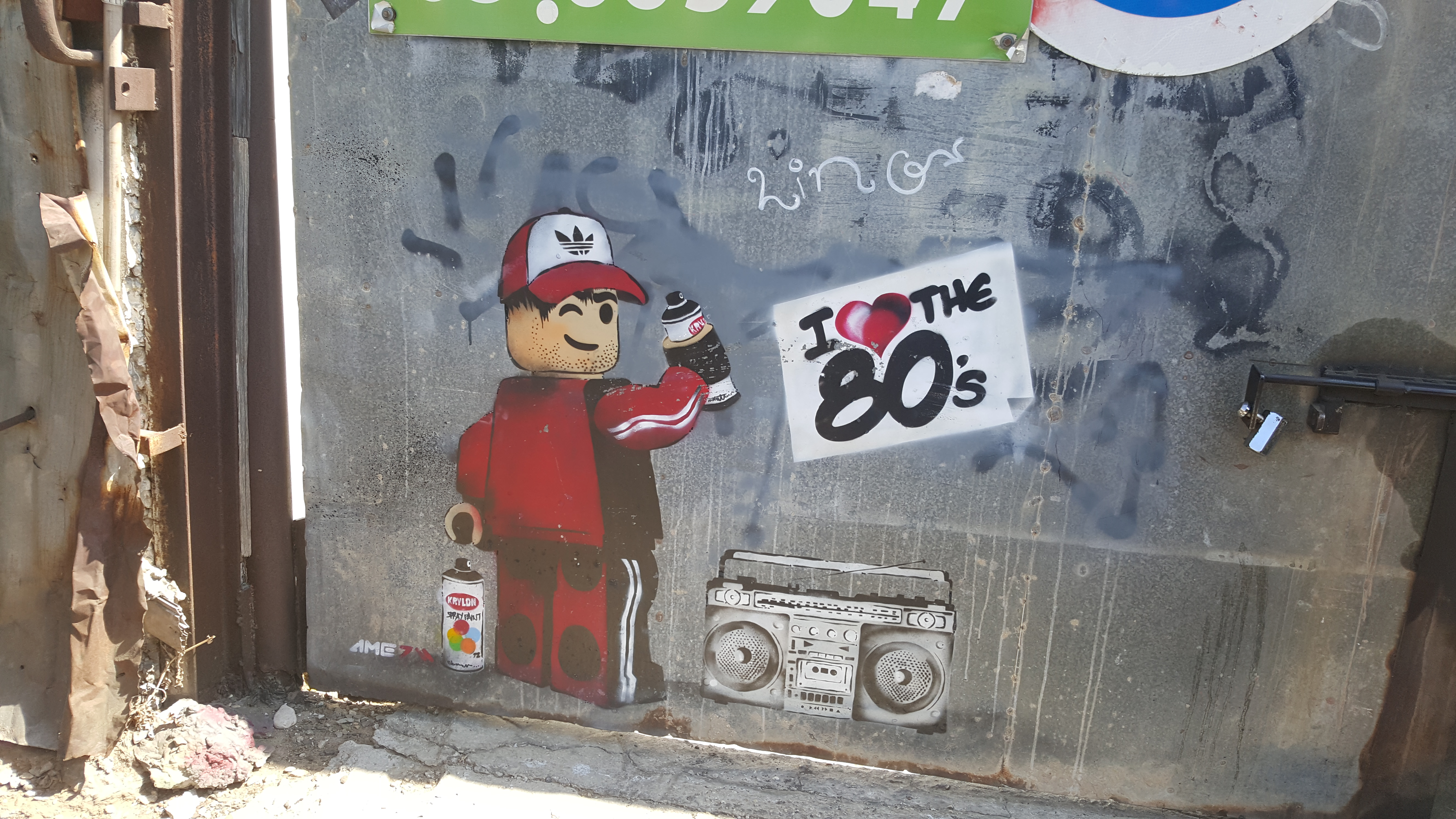
"I love the 80s" public art in Florentin, Tel Aviv

There are 1980s nostalgia films, concerts, books, paint and toy collectors. 1980s drinks have been revived. Shnot Hashmonim is a 1980s nostalgia television series.

=== Japan ===
In Japan, 1980s nostalgia is part of the broader phenomenon of "Shōwa nostalgia" and "Shōwa retro". There is nostalgia for 1980s television programmes such as Takeshi's Castle and The Best Ten; for 1980s city pop, new music and kayōkyoku music; for the 1980s music of artists such as Mariya Takeuchi, Yōko Oginome, Meiko Nakahara, Saki Kubota, Rebecca, Kome Kome Club, Princess Princess, Akina Nakamori, Seiko Matsuda, Hiroko Yakushimaru and Wink; for 1980s arcade games such as Pac-Man and Galaga; for 1980s computer consoles such as Famicom; for 1980s hairstyles such as the Seiko-chan cut; for 1980s floral pattern tableware; for 1980s vending machines; for 1980s analogue technology such as disposable cameras, VHS and cassette tapes; and for 1980s second hand goods. There are 1980s retro cars. Extremely Inappropriate! (2024) is a nostalgia television programme about the 1980s. Musicians ClariS (2023) and NewJeans (2024) have performed cover versions of 1980s songs that imitate the stage routines of Wink and Seiko Matsuda.

In 2017, the Yōko Oginome song "Dancing Hero (Eat You Up)" (1985) reached number 2 on the Billboard Japan Hot 100 chart. In 2021, the Mariya Takeuchi song "Plastic Love" (1985) reached number 5 on the Oricon Singles Chart.

=== Philippines ===
There is nostalgia for 1980s music such as the 1980s OPM music of the Boyfriends, Hagibis, Sampaguita and VST & Company. Nostalgia for 1980s music exists among Generation Y. There is a 1980s nostalgia musical adaptation of Bagets.

=== Singapore ===
There is nostalgia for 1980s mosaic playgrounds.

=== South Korea ===
There is nostalgia for the television programmes, music and fashion of the 1980s. There is nostalgia for 1980s technology such as cassette tapes. Reply 1988 (2015) is a nostalgia television series about the 1980s.

=== Thailand ===
There are 1980s nostalgia bands and concerts. There is 1980s retro music and markets. There is nostalgia for 1980s desserts.

== Australia ==
There is nostalgia for the 1980s art of Ken Done. The Newsreader (2021) is a nostalgia television program about the 1980s. Back to the 80s (2001) is a 1980s nostalgia musical. The Galvatrons have produced 1980s retro music.

== Europe ==
=== Belgium ===
There are 1980s nostalgia radio stations such as Nostalgie.

=== Denmark ===
There is nostalgia for 1980s music. There is 1980s retro lego.

=== Finland ===
As of 2013, there is more nostalgia for the 1980s than for any other decade. There are 1980s nostalgia television documentaries. There is nostalgia for 1980s toys. Kasari is a 1980s nostalgia nationwide FM radio station. HitMix 80s is a 1980s nostalgia internet radio station from HitMix. Litku Klemetti's Kukkia muovipussissa (2021) is a 1980s retro album and an expression of nostalgia for the 1980s music of Mona Carita.

=== Germany ===
There is more nostalgia for the 1980s than for any other decade. There is nostalgia for 1980s Italo pop and the 1980s music of artists such as Nena and the Scorpions. Deutschland 83 (2015) is a nostalgia television programme about the 1980s. Kleinruppin Forever (2004) is a nostalgia film about the 1980s. Generation Golf (2001) is a 1980s nostalgia book.

=== Greece ===
There are 1980s nostalgia exhibitions. The third series of Ta Kalytera mas Chronia (2023) is a 1980s nostalgia television programme. There is nostalgia for the 1980s music of Anna Vissi and Charis Alexiou.

=== Ireland ===
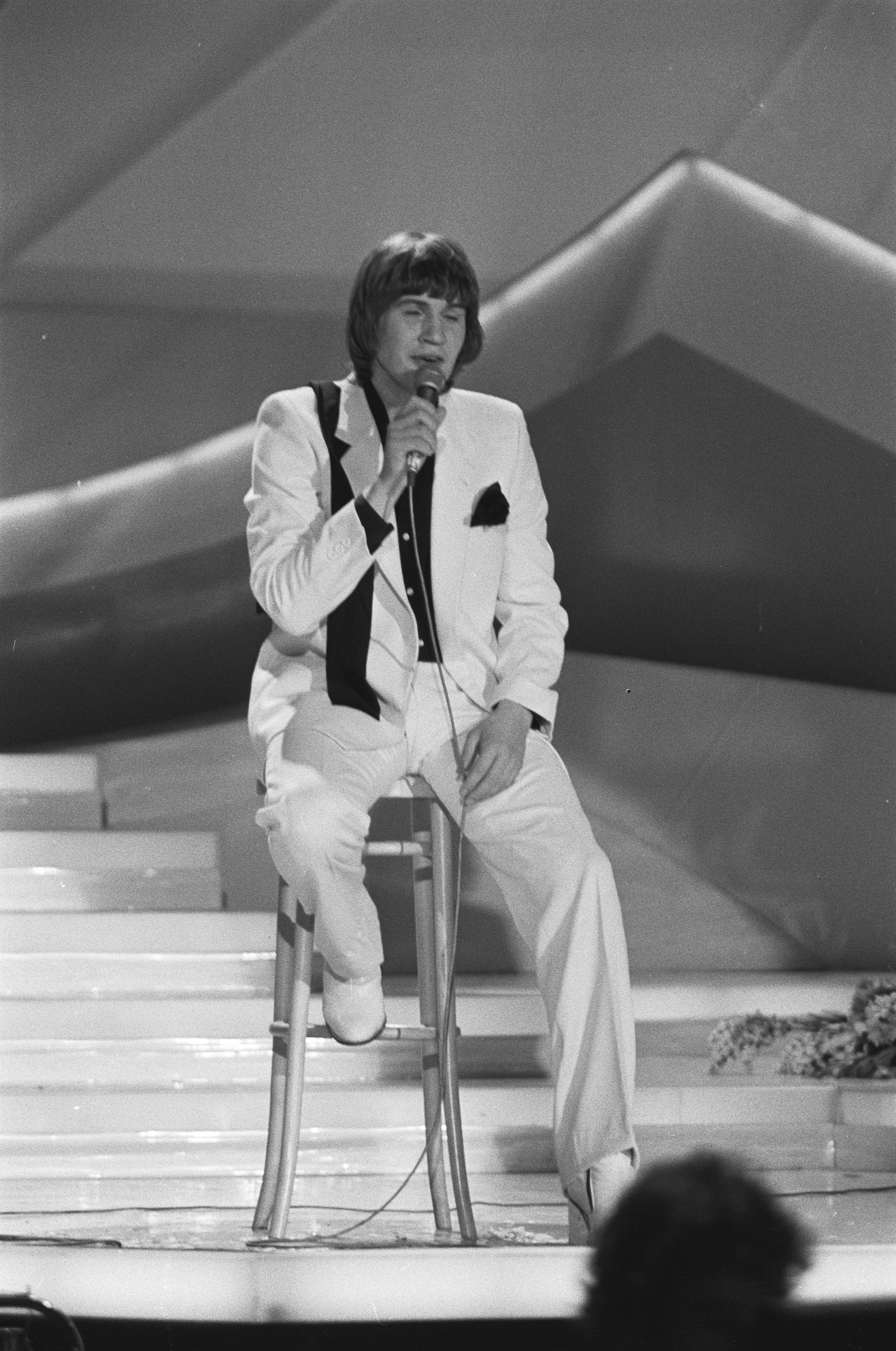
Johnny Logan in 1980

There is 1980s nostalgia among young people. There are 1980s nostalgia bands, radio services and music festivals. There is nostalgia for the 1980s music of Bagatelle, Cry Before Dawn, Hothouse Flowers and Johnny Logan; and for 1980s television programmes such as Bosco, Dempsey's Den and Wanderly Wagon.

=== Italy ===
There is nostalgia for 1980s paninaro. There are 1980s nostalgia concerts, theatre plays and trains.

=== Norway ===
Tilbake til 80-tallet (2006) is a 1980s nostalgia documentary. Gylne tider (2002) is a nostalgia television programme that includes the 1980s. There is nostalgia for the 1980s music of A-ha, Åge Aleksandersen, The Kids, Pelle Parafins Bøljeband and Return. There are 1980s nostalgia concerts.

=== Poland ===
Nieśpieszny is a 1980s retro train.

=== Russia ===
There is nostalgia for 1980s arcade machines, such as those at the Museum of Soviet Arcade Machines.

=== Spain ===
There are 1980s nostalgia exhibitions, social media threads and books. Oliver's Universe (2022) is a 1980s nostalgia film.

=== Sweden ===
There is nostalgia for the 1980s music of Factory, Magnum Bonum and Noice. There are 1980s nostalgia concerts. Let the Right One In (2008) is a 1980s retro film.

=== United Kingdom ===
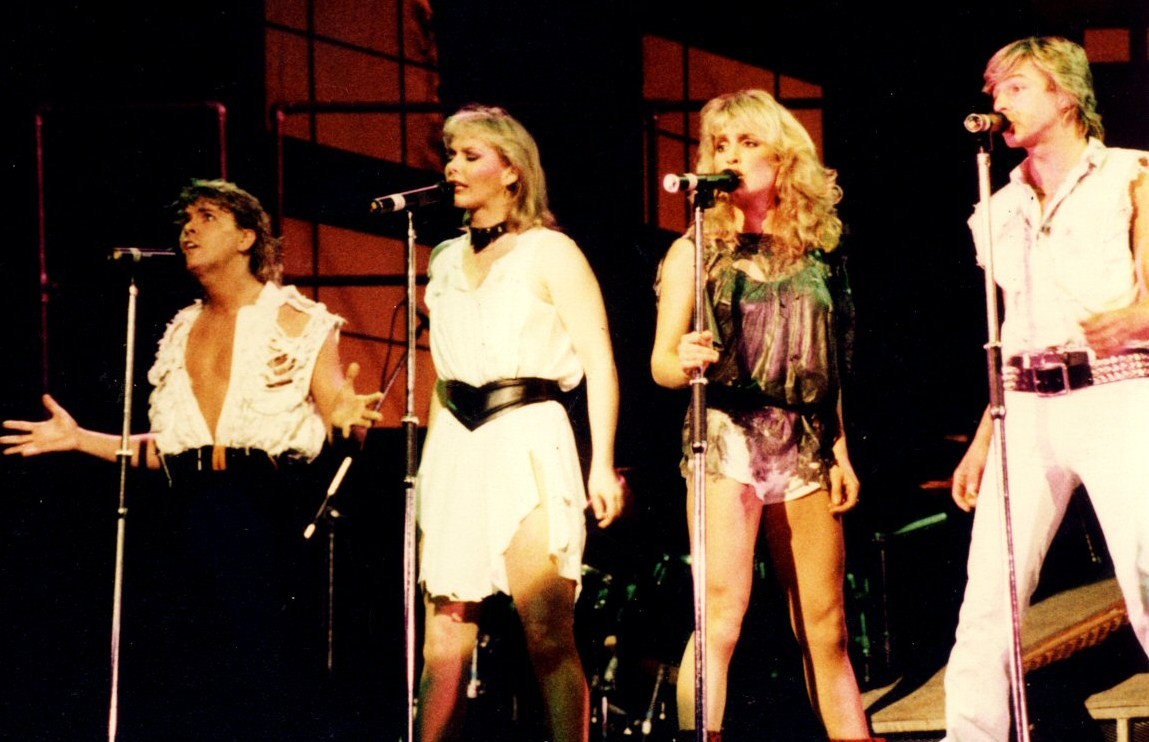
Bucks Fizz in 1984

In 2024, there was more nostalgia among people under thirty for the 1980s than for any other decade. There is nostalgia for the 1980s music of OMD, David Bowie, Duran Duran, Bananarama, George Michael, Boy George, Level 42 and Bucks Fizz; and for Frankie Say Relax T-shirts, New Romantics, Smash Hits, Filofax, spandex, fluffy dice, Knightmare, Doctor Who, Blake's 7, V, Max Headroom, Woolworths Pic n Mix, rave, shell suits, 1980s jewellery, and 1980s Christmases. Now 80s is a 1980s nostalgia music television channel. Hunting Venus (1999) is a 1980s nostalgia film. Ashes to Ashes (2008) is a nostalgia television programme about the 1980s. The Here and Now Tour is a 1980s nostalgia concert tour. There are 1980s nostalgia music festivals such as the Rewind Festival. There are 1980s nostalgia cruises, websites, museum exhibitions and experiential theatre. I Love the '80s (2001), Sounds of the Eighties (1996) and Match of the Eighties (1997) are 1980s nostalgia documentaries. 1980s music was rebroadcast in the music archive programme Top of the Pops 2 (1994), and 1980s episodes of Top of the Pops were repeated on BBC 4 from 2015 to 2020. Heart 80s and Absolute Radio 80s are 1980s nostalgia radio stations.

The Kate Bush song "Running Up That Hill" (1985) reached number 1 in the UK singles chart in 2022 as a result of being included in the fourth series of Stranger Things. In 2017, 1980s music was more popular than that of other decades. 1980s retro albums include Goldfrapp's Head First (2010) and Duran Duran's Future Past (2021).

Briscoe said that 1980s nostalgia frequently views the 1980s through an American lens that does not accurately reflect 1980s Britain.

=== Ex-Yugoslavia ===
The Border Post (2006) is a retro film about the 1980s. Crno-bijeli svijet (2015) is a retro television series about the 1980s.

== North America ==
=== Canada ===
There is nostalgia for the 1980s music of Men Without Hats and Mini Pop Kids; and for 1980s food brands such as President's Choice cookies. There have been 1980s retro markets and 1980s nostalgia radio programmes.

=== El Salvador ===
There are 1980s nostalgia videos which are popular.

=== Mexico ===
There are 1980s nostalgia films and television programmes, like Súbete a Mi Moto (2020) and Mentiras, la serie (2025). 1980s nostalgia television programmes about Mexico have been shown on ViX.

=== United States ===
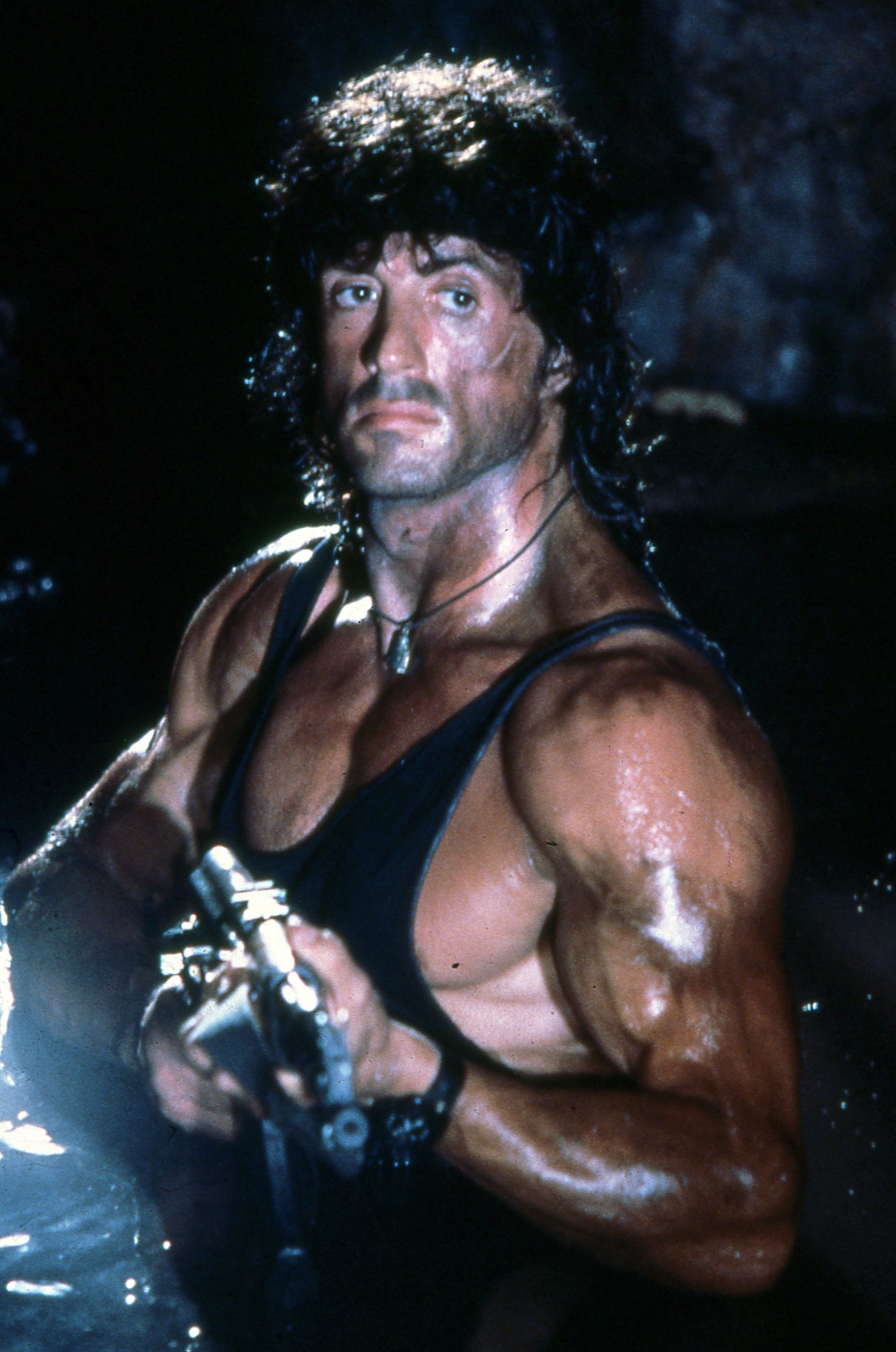
Sylvester Stallone in Rambo III (1988)

1980s nostalgia was predicted by the Cafe '80s (1989). There is nostalgia for 1980s music, fashion, hairstyles and childhood; for 1980s films such as those of Arnold Schwarzenegger and Sylvester Stallone; and for the New York City of the early 1980s. There are 1980s nostalgia conventions. There is 1980s nostalgia among Generation X and Generation Y. Generation Y have been watching repeats of 1980s television programmes since they were children, as such programmes have been continuously repeated since the 1980s. In 2013, people aged between 45 and 64 wanted to time travel to the 1980s more than any other decade, and the 1980s was the third most popular decade overall.

Nostalgia television programmes about the 1980s include That '80s Show (2002), Everybody Hates Chris (2005), The Americans (2013), The Goldbergs (2013), Halt and Catch Fire (2014), Red Oaks (2015), Stranger Things (2016) and Paper Girls (2022). Nostalgia films about the 1980s include The Wedding Singer (1998), Donnie Darko (2001), The Squid and the Whale (2005), Watchmen (2009), Adventureland (2009), Hot Tub Time Machine (2010), Atomic Blonde (2017), Summer of 84 (2018), Bumblebee (2018), Bones and All (2022), Air (2023), Totally Killer (2023) and The End of Oak Street (2026). The films Pixels (2015), Turbo Kid (2015) and Ready Player One (2018) are expressions of 1980s nostalgia. The film Drive (2011) is an expression of 1980s retro. Grosse Pointe Blank and Romy and Michele's High School Reunion are 1980s nostalgia films, from 1997, about the high school reunions of people who graduated in the 1980s. 1980s nostalgia documentaries include I Love the '80s (2002) and The Greatest Night in Pop (2024). The Big 80's (1994) was a 1980s nostalgia music television programme. The 1980s nostalgia boom includes remakes and reboots of, and sequels to, films and television programmes released in the 1980s. Sequels include those to Tron, Blade Runner and Wall Street.

The Metallica song "Master of Puppets" (1986) charted in 2022, as a result of being included in Stranger Things. In 2021, 1980s music was more popular than that of other decades. There is nostalgia for the 1980s music of Blondie. By 2024, it was reported that Michael Jackson's music, including especially the album Thriller (1982) and its title track, becomes popular around Halloween every year, and often reappears on Billboard charts, including the Hot 100 and 200. Taylor Swift's 1989 (2014) is a 1980s retro album. 1980s nostalgia compilation albums include Like Omigod! The 80s Pop Culture Box (Totally) (2002) and Now That's What I Call the 80s (2007).

Grand Theft Auto: Vice City (2002) is a 1980s retro video game. There are 1980s nostalgia influencers on social media.

== South America ==
=== Argentina ===
Graduados (2012) is a 1980s nostalgia telenovela.

=== Brazil ===
There are 1980s nostalgia documentaries, like those about Balão Mágico and Xuxa, and 1980s nostalgia auto shows. Samantha! (2018) is a 1980s retro comedy.

== See also ==
- 1950s nostalgia
- 1960s nostalgia
- 1970s nostalgia
- 1990s nostalgia
- First-wave 1980s revival in 2000s fashion
- Second-wave 1980s revival in 2000s fashion
- Legacy media in music in the 2020s
- Electropop in the 21st century
