= George Georgiou (designer) =

British designer associated with acid house

- Born: 21 December 1959 (age 66); Hampstead, London, England
- Education: Hornsey College of Art; Leicester Polytechnic (BA Hons, 3D Design)
- Occupations: Graphic and interior designer
- Known for: Flyers and club design; popularising the smiley face in acid house culture
- Notable work: Flyers for Shoom, Special Branch, RAW; nightclub interiors including Milk Bar and Velvet Underground
- Website: www.georgegeorgiouclubart.com

George Georgiou (born 21 December 1959) is a British graphic and interior designer. He is best known for his work in London's club scene during the 1980s and 1990s and for his role in shaping the visual identity associated with the early acid house movement.

== Career ==
Georgiou worked for various London interior design agencies on a diverse range of projects in the restaurant, retail and residential sectors. From 1985, he began designing flyers, banners and dance floors for London warehouse parties and clubs in his spare time.

=== Shoom flyer and the smiley face ===
In 1987, Georgiou designed the flyer for Shoom, one of London's earliest acid house nights. At the request of promoter Danny Rampling, he incorporated a smiley face motif. While the smiley face was already in use as a symbol, The Guardian has described Georgiou's Shoom flyer as an influential reworking that resonated with the emerging acid house scene and contributed to the visual identity of UK rave culture.

=== Club graphics and interiors ===
Georgiou produced flyers and visual material for promoters including Nicky Holloway and Oliver Peyton. His work later extended into nightclub interiors during the 1990s, including venues such as the Milk Bar and Velvet Underground.

== Exhibitions ==
Georgiou's work has been included in exhibitions on club culture and design, such as The Art of Selling Songs at the Victoria and Albert Museum (1991), Night Fever: Designing Club Culture 1960–Today at the Vitra Design Museum (2018–2021), and Sweet Harmony: Rave Today at the Saatchi Gallery (2019)

== Appearance in published works ==
His work has been reproduced in books on club culture and graphic design, such as:

- Cynthia Rose, Design After Dark (1991)
- Jon Savage, Highflyers: Clubravepartyart (1996)
- Nicola Ackland Snow and Nathan Brett, Fly: The Art of the Club Flyer (1996)
- Nick de Ville, Album: Style and Image in Sleeve Design (2003)
- Bill Brewster and Rick Banks, Clubbed: A Visual History of UK Club Culture (2018)
- Chelsea Louise Berlin, Rave Art (2014)
- UK Rave Flyers 1988–1989 (Phatmedia, 2025)

== Legacy ==
Georgiou has been described in The Guardian as a contributor to the visual language of UK club culture, with his Shoom flyer frequently cited as an early and influential example of acid house visual identity.

In 2024, he established the George Georgiou Gallery, a digital archive of his work, accompanied by a public art installation of yellow plaques marking the sites of former London club venues, including RAW, Shoom, SIN and the Milk Bar.

== Media appearances ==
Georgiou has been featured in documentaries examining rave and club culture, including How Clubbing Changed the World (Channel 4, 2012), presented by Idris Elba, and The Man Who Made the Acid Smiley Famous (Vice/Noisey, 2017), which explored his role in shaping the visual identity of acid house.
