= Alfredo Fiorito =

Argentine disk jockey (1953–2024)

- Born: 20 April 1953; Rosario, Santa Fe Province, Argentina
- Died: December 2024 (aged 71) Ibiza, Spain
- Genre: Balearic beat
- Occupations: Disc jockey, record producer
- Years active: 1976–2024

Alfredo Fiorito (20 April 1953 – December 2024) was an Argentine disc jockey. He has been credited as the "Father of the Balearic beat".

After emigrating to Spain and arriving on the Balearic island of Ibiza in September 1976, Alfredo became a DJ at Amnesia, where his eclectic DJ style had a major influence on dance music's explosion on the island and beyond in the late 1980s.

== Early life ==
Fiorito was born in the city of Rosario in the province of Santa Fe, Argentina. His early working life was focused on training to become a journalist, and eventually he worked as a music critic on a newspaper. In 1976, at the age of 23, he emigrated to mainland Spain. After a short period he relocated to Ibiza.

== Ibiza ==
Fiorito took various jobs following his arrival on Ibiza, including candlemaker, delivery driver and fashion designer. He also worked as a barman in a bar near the harbour in Ibiza Town called Be Bop. The bar was equipped with a couple of turntables and a mixer, and in 1982 Alfredo began to DJ.

== Amnesia ==
While Alfredo was building a reputation at Be Bop he was asked to DJ for a party at the outdoor terrace club called Amnesia in the nearby village of San Rafael. During this time Amnesia was regarded as the most underground venue on the island. Alfredo's first appearance at the club was in 1983 at a private party, and at first his sets, an eclectic mix of house, disco and pop, were not well received. Nevertheless, Alfredo persisted and in the next year he began to draw crowds, eventually leading to a six-year residency at the club. Gradually, Ibiza's fashionable crowds began to relocate to Amnesia from the neighboring Ku-club (now called UNVRS).

== Influence ==
Alfredo is regarded as having a significant influence on dance music's explosion on the island of Ibiza and the wider world.

=== The UK scene ===
In 1987 four British DJs attended Amnesia. The group was made up of Danny Rampling, Paul Oakenfold, Nicky Holloway and Johnny Walker. At the club, the group were introduced to the unique eclectic style of Alfredo's sets, which included pop, soul, funk, jazz and other sounds along with emerging house music then being exported from the USA. They also discovered the music's powerful synergy with the drug MDMA, which reduced inhibitions and contributed to a sense of oneness on the dancefloor. The friends returned to England and set about recreating their experience and the sounds that Alfredo had introduced to them. Danny Rampling set up what is regarded as the UK's first Balearic rave, a clubnight called Shoom, which took place in a disused fitness centre in Southwark. Oakenfold hosted an "Ibiza Reunion" party which evolved into one of the UK's major acid house nights, Spectrum, at Heaven in Charing Cross.

== Death ==
On 24 December 2024, it was announced that Fiorito had died at the age of 71.
