= Shoom =

1987–1990 dance music event

The Shoom logo on a grey background. Variants of this design were used for posters, flyers and t-shirts.

Shoom was a weekly all-nighter dance music event in London, England, between September 1987 and early 1990. It is widely credited with initiating the acid house movement in the UK. Shoom was founded by Danny Rampling, then an unknown DJ and record producer, and managed by his wife Jenni. The club began at a 300-capacity basement gym on Southwark Street in South London. By May 1988, its growing popularity necessitated a move to the larger Raw venue on Tottenham Court Road, Central London, and a switch from Saturday to Thursday nights. Later relocations were to The Park Nightclub, Kensington and Busby's venue on Charing Cross Road.

The early nights featured Danny Rampling and Terry Farley as the in-house DJs, playing a mixture of Chicago house, Balearic and Detroit techno, mixed with contemporary pop and post-punk music. The club favoured modern, minimalist architectural interior designs, filled with strawberry-scented smoke machines and strobe lights. Its musical and visual culture evolved around the psychedelic drug LSD, and MDMA, an empathogen commonly known in the UK as ecstasy or "E". (Note: Ecstasy is commonly known as "Molly" in the US.) Over time, regular guest DJs included Carl Cox, Mark Moore and Andrew Weatherall.

Within weeks of its opening, far more people were trying to get into Shoom than the venue could hold. The Ramplings were forced to adopt a strict entrance policy, with Jenni taking on the unpopular role of doorman. Shoom closed early in 1990 after drug use at the club began to attract police attention. By this time, electronic music had crossed into the mainstream as the heavier-sounding rave style became popular, making Shoom appear outdated.

== Formation ==
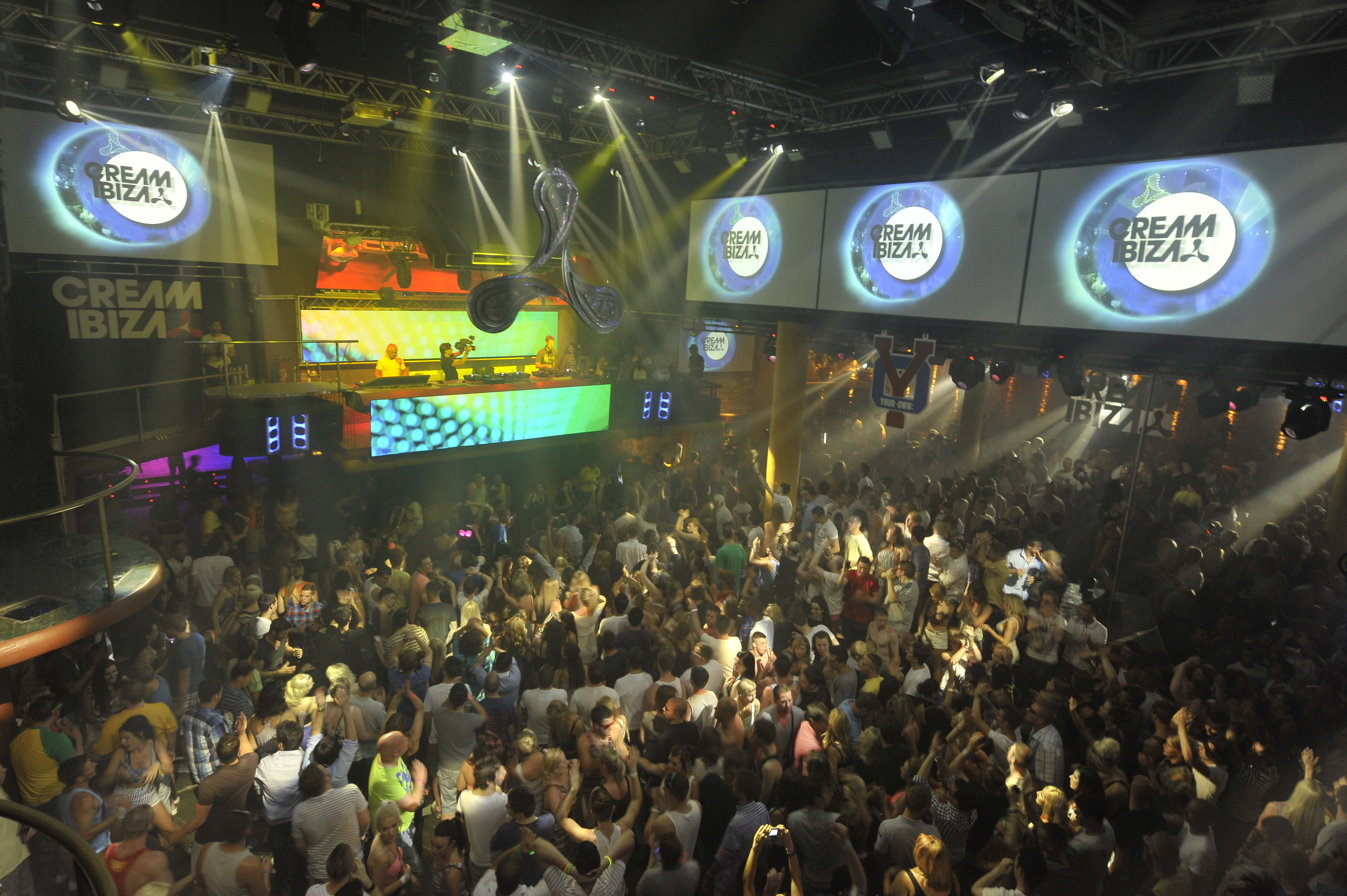
The Amnesia nightclub in Ibiza was the primary influence for Shoom.

English DJ and record producer Paul Oakenfold spent the summer of 1985 in Ibiza, where he met DJs Trevor Fung and Ian St. Paul. To celebrate his birthday, Oakenfold hired an island villa and invited the London DJs Nicky Holloway, Johnnie Walker, and the then-unknown Danny Rampling. While there, Rampling took ecstasy for the first time and was deeply impressed by the music and atmosphere at Alfredo Fiorito's open-air and after-hours Amnesia nightclub and at Pepe Rosello's Space.

Neither Danny nor Jenni had experience in organising nightclubs. However, upon returning to England, they sought to recreate the atmosphere of the Balearic beat clubs they had seen in Ibiza. The couple was described by journalist Louise Gray as a "very ordinary, upwardly mobile working class couple" from Bermondsey, in South East London. (Note: The couple had recently met before their visit to Ibiza. They married in February 1988.) Shoom opened around the same time as the two other early acid house clubs in London: Holloway's Balearic The Trip (from June 1987), and Oakenfold's house-focused Spectrum (from April 1988 until 1990 at Heaven on Charing Cross). (Note: The well-established Holloway and the newcomer Rampling fell out around this time, as according to Holloway, Rampling started Shoom without letting him know, and took The Trip's flyer designer, head of security, and Cox's sound system. Holloway said "Danny was my mate and my [record] box carrier, and no one really took him seriously, and then all of a sudden he was catapulted to superstardom. I had my nose put out of joint, I really did." Rampling disputes this and said he was "pissed off" by Holloway's reaction. The two resolved their differences shortly afterwards.)

Shoom's name was inspired by a phrase Rampling heard from Fung in Ibiza when describing the effects of "rushing" on ecstasy. The opening night was held on a Saturday in November 1987, and titled "Klub Schoom", but this was shortened to "Shoom" by the second night. It opened at the downstairs Fitness Centre gym at 56–58 Crown House, Southwark Street, South London, a space Ramping hired because of its small, intimate size and affordability. The crowd in the first weeks was small enough that the Ramplings could greet each person as they arrived, and say goodnight as they left. Shoom's resident DJ Terry Farley believes this approach enhanced its early standing and helped develop its cult-like following. The local council had granted the gym an events licence, which meant that although they could not serve alcohol, they could stay open until 5 am, giving the nights an underground and illegal aura.

Shoom was one of the first clubs to adopt the Smiley face in their promotional material.

Rampling borrowed from family and friends to fund the opening night, and asked Carl Cox to provide the sound system. The gym had two rooms; Rampling and Cox played in the main hall, while Farley played funk and rare groove in the backroom. Although the opening night attracted around a hundred people and broke even, Danny did not view it as successful due to the unfocused variety of musical styles played. By the second night, his sets focused on Balearic and house music. He retained Cox as a regular DJ, but switched from Cox's sound system to one owned by DJ Joey Jay. Shoom almost immediately attained cult status with dance music fans, who saw it as the antithesis of the then-prevalent West End trend for clubs where it was "cool to be seen". Within weeks, the queue to enter the club grew from a few hundred to over a thousand, leading to a move in March 1988 to Thursday nights at Raw, a venue in the basement of a YMCA on Tottenham Court Road, and finally to Busby's venue on Charing Cross Road with even larger capacity.

The club's popularity grew after it was praised by influential clubbers such as Anton Le Pirate, Michael Clarke, Alan McGee and Bobby Gillespie, and celebrities including Sade, Leigh Bowery, Paul Rutherford, and the journalists Gary Crowley and Robert Elms. In each venue, Shoom was usually tightly packed with an above-capacity number of attendees. Writer David Cavanagh describes an atmosphere dominated by "heat and crush", while Richard Norris (later of the electronic dance group The Grid) said that when he attended, "there was no oxygen. We were lighting our lighters and the flames were going out." By January 1988, Shoom was using smiley face graphics in promotional flyers and posters. Widely used during the Summer of Love, Shoom re-popularised the image, leading to its eventual widespread use as an iconic emblem for the UK acid house movement.

From the beginning, the Ramplings sought to maintain the club's underground status, and so tried to minimise attention from the music and general press. To avoid mainstream notice, Jenni started a free periodic hand-out newsletter promoting the club's "peace and love" ethos soon after their move to Tottenham Court Road. It was filled with cartoon drawings, smiley faces, poetry and extracts from fan letters containing exuberant and hippyish praise such as "Shoom ... creates the freedom to be ourselves." She consulted with public relations companies to help promote the nights but ensured that any publicity was kept low-key, and Jenni personally asked journalists not to write about it.

== Club ==
=== Music ===
Until Shoom, house music in the UK was regarded as an imported, derivative form of either Hi-NRG or disco. Although house music had already achieved popularity in clubs in Northern England and the Midlands, particularly in Manchester, Sheffield and Nottingham, few London clubs (mostly Black and/or gay) played the music, notably Noel and Maurice Watson's Delirium events at the Astoria, and Pyramid at Heaven and Jungle at Busby's, where house was played alongside electro music. Shoom's first two nights attracted a funk, soul and rare groove audience, many of whom came dressed in retro 1970s style clothes, including bell-bottoms and large collared shirts. Danny Rampling and Farley became the resident DJs, Farley usually playing the back room. Frequent guest DJs included Carl Cox, Colin Faver, Mark Moore and Andrew Weatherall. Rampling's DJ box was positioned level with the dance floor, rather than, as was then usual, in a booth above the crowd. His style was praised by several early Chicago house producers, including Marshall Jefferson. Chicago DJ Bam Bam played at Shoom in 1988 and was impressed enough to compare it to the Muzic Box club made famous by Ron Hardy.

As acid house music spread in popularity across the UK during 1988, the summer became known as the Second Summer of Love, named after the 1967 Californian Summer of Love. But whereas the earlier scene was inspired by the psychedelic drug LSD, the 1988 movement was based on the widespread availability of ecstasy. The writer Matthew Collin notes how both movements shared beliefs around the idea of "collective consciousness", but because ecstasy is a stimulant rather than a psychedelic drug, in stark contrast to the earlier summer, the acid house scene was rarely intellectualised, placed in historical context, and there are only a handful of published contemporaneous accounts and very little surviving video footage. Farley said that contemporary UK house DJs chose electronic records that "made...sense on E." Shoom developed a reputation for playing innovative and modern acid house music; they introduced Phuture's seminal 1987 Roland TB-303 based "Acid Tracks" to a UK audience, and helped popularise Humanoid's 1988 crossover single "Stakker Humanoid". Weatherall had been a regular attendee before being asked to play. His sets at Shoom were built on a blend of Detroit and acid house, interspersed with tracks by artists such as Ravi Shankar, Chris & Cosey, Public Image Ltd and Dub Syndicate.

=== Lighting and design ===
Shoom's interior design tended towards minimalist architecture, mirrored walls and decorations containing smiley face logos. The Ramplings' early adoption of the smiley logo reflected the prevailing feeling of positivism in dance music culture. Coleman, who later became a well-known fashion designer, said that at Shoom "everyone was smiling and losing themselves in this incredibly powerful music ... [and] new youth culture." The strawberry-scented smoke machine produced a haze so thick that the club often became claustrophobic, and combined with flashing strobe lights, dancers were often unable to see more than a few feet around them. Mark Moore of S'Express remembers that during his first night at the club, he did not realise until the smoke lifted during a breakdown that everybody around him "was on E."

=== Dress style and culture ===
Shoom was among the first clubs to bring US house music to the UK and was thus at the forefront of the development of the movement's look and style. Clubbers typically wore baggy clothes and tie-dye or dayglo colours, with items such as bucket hats, bandanas, dungaree jeans, ponchos and converse sneakers becoming popular. While the baggy style was born of necessity to combat the intense heat in the original small gym, the trend spread outside of the regular Shoom crowd, and celebrity fashion designers such as Vivienne Westwood produced clothes influenced by the scene. The DJ Jay Strongman observed how, after Shoom's launch, well-established figures in London's club scene became "dinosaurs" overnight. Similarly, Nick Coleman wrote that after visiting the club in July 1988, he immediately went from designer clothing and standing around "trying to look cool", to wearing t-shirts, jeans and ...[and having] 50 new friends". He views Shoom as initiating a move away from expensive clothes in favour of the casual, baggy style that typified the 1990s trend of "dressing down".

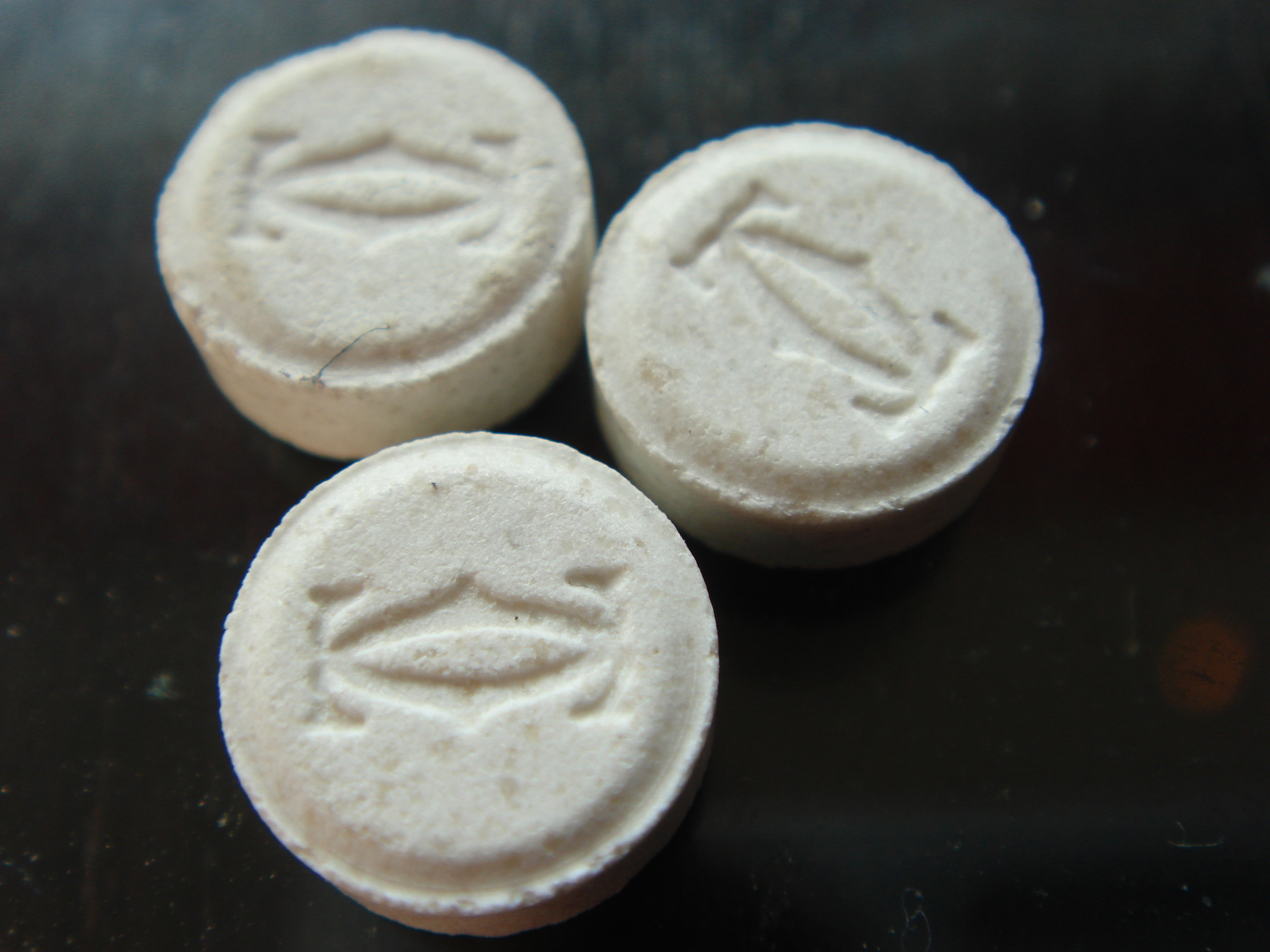
Off-white ecstasy pills with brand imprints

Until the summer of 1987, ecstasy was only known to a few British dance music enthusiasts, including Boy George, Marc Almond of Soft Cell and New Order's Bernard Sumner, who frequented US clubs such as Studio 54 in New York, and the Warehouse and Muzic Box clubs in Chicago, where they heard DJs such as the early 1980s pioneer DJs Ron Hardy and Frankie Knuckles. (Note: By the time ecstasy became popular with clubbers in late 1987, London dealers had difficulty keeping up with demand, and supply often came from clubbers bringing powdered MDMA back from trips to Amsterdam.) As little was popularly known about ecstasy, there was a common misconception that it was legal, when it was in fact listed as Class A under the UK Misuse of Drugs Act. While house music and the ecstasy sub-culture developed independently, they did not become mainstream until combined at London clubs in 1987. Sheryl Garratt, one of the earliest journalists to write about the scene, believes the music worked so well with the drug because the warm and empathetic high from ecstasy aligned with the small, intimate size of the early London clubs, and the shared excitement of discovering a new and revolutionary form of electronic music. Bottled water and the energy drink Lucozade became the club's most popular drinks, partly because the gym could not sell alcohol, but mainly because many clubbers noticed how alcohol dulled the impact of the ecstasy high. A myth was that vitamin C also reduced the drug's impact, so orange juice was taken off the bar menu.

The music writer Simon Reynolds describes Shoom as "unlike any West End club ... [it] was not about being seen, but about losing it – your cool, your self-consciousness, your self." Weatherall viewed it as a far more spiritual experience than both the later house clubs and early 1990s free open-air warehouse parties. (Note: Like many of the first Shoom regulars, Boy George claims that MDMA in the late 1980s was different from later pills as it was "much purer".) Ecstasy had a profound effect on many clubbers, some of whose experiences were so intense that Jenni's newsletters eventually had to advise patrons not to get too absorbed into the scene, as it seemed many were considering giving up their day jobs so they could go clubbing as often as possible. Farley described them "almost like disciples of Danny's." Danny claims he did not take ecstasy while DJing, fearing it would interfere with his performance, and as Shoom was a weekend club night, restricted his intake to the early week. He admitted that at times the nights became so heavy that he had to physically carry out those who had passed out or were overcome by the room's intensity and heat. Both Ramplings later said that they were often asked for life advice by clubbers who were very young and had little life experience, but felt unequipped to give answers.

=== Door policy ===
Within weeks of opening, Shoom attracted crowds far above that which the 300-capacity Southwark Street gym could hold. Jenni was naturally shy of press attention, but took charge of the door and the club's promotion, which she limited to flyers and newsletters. Adopting a policy of "no trendies, no pop stars", Jenni decided on who was given entry and this inevitably led to her gaining a reputation as rude and arrogant. The early Shoom clubber Jason Hawkins said that as attendance grew and regulars could no longer get in, Jenni became "hated, literally hated. We used to call her Hitler". He compared Shoom's entrance policy as being as strict and elitist as at Steve Strange's early 1980s New Romantic nightclub The Blitz in the West End, then viewed with disdain for being overly concerned with "being seen", wearing expensive suits or dresses and appearing "jet set". This similarity led many clubbers to believe Jenni had betrayed Shoom's original ethos of inclusiveness.

Jenni left school without qualifications and, when thrown into a high-profile role, adopted a straight-talking, no-nonsense personality. In a 2015 interview, she said that she sought a diverse crowd, with "a lot of gays, black people, white people, old hip hop people." Shrugging off her reputation, she said that even though the job was often difficult, she was largely comfortable with being insulted as long as she could achieve her preferred mix of attendees. Contemporary London nightclub doorman Denzil Roberts agrees, and during the same interview said that when judging who was to be allowed in, he kept in mind that the club was only as good as the crowd, as "they are the party", and admitted each person after asking himself what that person could bring to the club's atmosphere.

== Closure ==
Shoom closed early in 1990. By then, Danny Rampling viewed the dance music scene as having "deteriorated" and become mainstream. Electronic music had moved from the early acid house sound towards the more aggressive and faster "rave" style. Separately, the scene had begun to attract negative attention from the tabloid press, including front page headlines such as "Evil of Ecstasy" and "Shoot These Evil Acid Barons". The coverage was described as having an "outraged" tone, and forced the UK police to react by shutting down events and arresting both organisers and patrons, leading the Ramplings to fear they might become subject to criminal charges. (Note: The negative media continued until the mid-1990s, culminating in the Criminal Justice and Public Order Act 1994, in which section 63(1)(b) outlawed gathering to "sounds wholly or predominantly characterised by the emission of a succession of repetitive beats".)

The couple divorced in the early 1990s. After Shoom, Danny built a career as an internationally renowned DJ, while Jenni retired from the music industry and became a successful businesswoman.

== Legacy ==
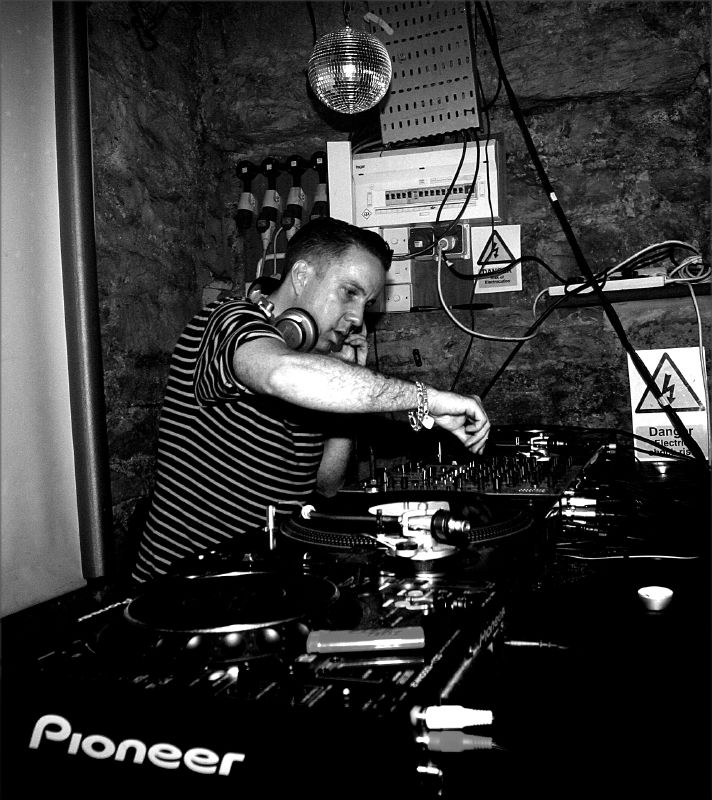
Andrew Weatherall, 2009

After Shoom closed, London club promoters often compared themselves in terms of what Rampling had achieved, even as they often sought to dismiss his music. Richard West (also known as Mr. C) said that outside of sets by Faver, Shoom generally played "namby-pamby sort of stuff, lightweight gear". He said that, by 1990, dance music had evolved to become more "tripped-out", while Reynolds wrote that by the early 1990s electronic music had evolved to a point that was "a long way from Balearic." According to West, the early 1990s rave scene that emerged at clubs such as RIP (Revolution in Place) on Clink Street, eclipsed Shoom and the Balearic sound, even before larger-scale, often illegal, open-air parties became the prevailing trend. West notes how, by 1990, many felt that the Balearic sound had become dated and sounded like pop music.

New Order's 1989 album Technique was recorded in Ibiza, while its musical approach and percussion was influenced by band members Sumner and Peter Hook's experiences at Shoom. Primal Scream have said that the inspiration for their 1991 Weatherall-produced album Screamadelica to the sounds and atmosphere they experienced at Shoom nights during 1989. Weatherall said of his first night at the club: "I just couldn't believe it. I [was] a confused punk soul boy, and to me it was ... the ... dream come true. I just could not fucking believe the mix of music." The band asked vocalist Denise Johnson, who was pivotal in the album's crossover success, to contribute after hearing her perform at Shoom. In 2005, Shoom was placed at number seven by Billboard in their list of the 25 Best of all time dance clubs. Two 25th Anniversary nights were held at the Cable Nightclub in London in 2012.
