= Balearic beat =

Subgenre of house music

- Stylistic origins: House music; deep house; electronica; post-disco; Mediterranean music; bossa nova; Europop
- Cultural origins: Late 1980s, Ibiza (Spain)

Other topics
- Tropical house; Balearic trance

Balearic beat, also known as Balearic house, Balearic, Ibiza house or Ibizan chillout, is an eclectic blend of DJ-led dance music that emerged in the mid-1980s. It later became the name of a more specific style of electronic dance/house music that was popular into the mid-1990s. Balearic beat was named for its popularity among European nightclub and beach rave patrons on the Balearic island of Ibiza, a popular tourist destination. Some dance music compilations referred to it as "the sound of Ibiza", even though many other, more aggressive and upbeat forms of dance music could be heard on the island, such as Balearic trance.

== History ==
This style was popularized at Amnesia, an Ibizan nightclub, by DJ Alfredo from Argentina, who had a residency there. DJ Alfredo, whose birth name is Alfredo Fiorito, has been credited as the "Father of the Balearic beat". Alfredo played an eclectic mix of dance music with his style encompassing the indie hypno grooves of the Woodentops, the mystic rock of the Waterboys, early house, Europop and oddities from the likes of Peter Gabriel and Chris Rea. Similar music was being played at other nightclubs, including Pacha and Ku.

British DJs such as Nancy Noise, Trevor Fung, Danny Rampling and Electra's Paul Oakenfold are commonly credited with having "popularised" Balearic beat, especially in the UK, with Fung said to be the originator of the term. In 1987, after a holiday in Ibiza, Oakenfold, Fung and Ian St. Paul returned to London, where they unsuccessfully tried to establish a nightclub called the Funhouse in the Balearic style. Returning to Ibiza during the summer of 1987, Oakenfold rented a villa where he hosted a number of his DJ friends, including Danny Rampling, Johnny Walker, and Nicky Holloway. Returning to London after the summer, Oakenfold reintroduced the Balearic style at a South London nightclub called the Project Club. The club initially attracted those who had visited Ibiza and who were familiar with the Balearic concept. Fueled by their use of Ecstasy and an emerging fashion style based on baggy clothes and bright colors, these Ibiza veterans were responsible for propagating the Balearic subculture within the evolving UK rave scene. In 1988, Oakenfold established a second outlet for Balearic beat, a Monday night event called Spectrum, which is credited with exposing the Balearic concept to a wider audience. It was 1988 when Balearic beat was first noticed in the U.S., according to Dance Music Report magazine. Jose Padilla was an Ibizan DJ best known for his residency at Café del Mar. Also Jon Sa Trinxa, a British DJ and Producer best known for the longest residency on Salinas Beach at Sa Trinxa defines his style as being Balearic Music.

Pitchfork traces back elements of Balearic beat music to the 1982 Indian album Disco Jazz, sung by Rupa Biswas and composed by Aashish Khan. According to Pitchfork, the Bengali language song "Aaj Shanibar" from Disco Jazz contains "touches of what would now be considered Balearic beat music, with its expansive and hypnotic musical interludes." However, the album was largely unknown until its rediscovery in the late 2010s.

== Style ==
Two years ago, a club world constantly in search of new beats and a media constantly in search of new trends were presented with a bright bouncy new baby which answered to the name 'Balearic Beat'...the fact that the only 'rule' proposed was that "there are no rules" was ignored...Then came Mr Balearic's lucky break: Soul II Soul. A mish mash of styles (soul, hip hop, reggae) all moulded over a rock solid beat met the 'anything goes as long as it's danceable' criteria—and more importantly, it allowed the world to rediscover a BPM below 122...These days in clubland, rap, house and soul freely rub shoulders with continental beats, alternative grooves, and a whole welter of diverse sounds constructed from an even more diverse set of influences. This is what 'Balearic' was all about...Laying down rules or attempting to initiate trends is completely contrary to what the 'Balearic Spirit' was all about (if only its pioneers had explained it better at the time we might not have spent two years getting to where we are now). An effective blanket ban on house/uptempo music in a club is silly, short-sighted, and narrow minded, and it won't take long for people to see it as such...What the 'Balearic concept' has taught us is that it doesn't matter what genre the track falls into, as long as the beat 'n' groove move the feet and what's on top of 'em is pleasing to the ear.

— Mixmag editorial, "Famous Last Words on Clubland's Class System or 'How We Learned to Love the Balearic Beat'". Mixmag: 71–73. July 1990.

Balearic beat records vary between house or Italo house and deep house influenced sounds and a slower R&B-influenced (under 119bpm) beat consisting of bass drum, snare and hi-hats (often produced with a Roland TR-909 drum machine) programmed in certain laid-back, swing-beat patterns; plus soul, Latin, African, funk and dub affectations; and production techniques borrowed from other styles of dance music that were popular at the time. Vocals were sometimes present, but much of the music was instrumental. The sounds of acoustic instruments such as guitar and piano were sometimes incorporated into Balearic beat. Having been primarily associated with a particular percussion pattern that eventually fell out of vogue, the style eventually faded from prominence and its repertoire was subsumed by the more general "chill out" and "downtempo" genres.

The style of Balearic beat is described by the original followers, as opposed to its UK followers, as the ability for the DJ to play across a broad range of styles, from early minimal New Beat to the first extended remixes of pop-songs, making Balearic DJ sets those that tend to have the sharpest turns of musical direction. While the public outside Ibiza generally describes Balearic beat as a music style, the island based community regard Balearic beat as a non-style or a healthy disrespect to style conformity and a challenge to the norm. It's a freestyle expression that seamlessly binds sporadic vinyl inspiration through technical flair on the turntables. Today, due to stylistic segregation in electronic dance music, few promoters and DJs dare to stretch the spectrum of styles that far in fear of losing identity and clients. DJ Alfredo still heralds the most diversity among Ibiza DJs, but generally the approach to mixing as well as the terminology, have been swallowed up by the Chillout scene.

Ibiza is still considered by some to have its own "sound", however, including the music of Jens Gad, co-creator of Enigma, and his new chillout-world-influenced hybrid project, Achillea, recorded in his studio in the hills overlooking Ibiza. Compilations such as Global Lounge Sessions: The Balearic Sound of Ibiza, released in 2002, and Sequoia Groove's Buddha-Lounge series, continue to be released. These generally feature house music and certain downtempo selections, not the old style of Balearic beat, per se. Some prefer to use the term Balearic more generally, however, to apply to all of these styles.

== See also ==
- Balearic trance
- Shoom
- Roger Shah
