= Manumission (event) =

Ibiza partying

- Privilege Nightclub, later at Amnesia nightclub
- Location: San Rafael, Ibiza, Spain
- Owner: Jose Maria Etxaniz
- Operator: (Manumission), Not for profit
- Capacity: 10000 (privilege)
- Type: Club night
- Event: Dance Music
- Record attendance: 13000 (privilege)

Construction
- Opened: 1994
- Closed: 2008

Manumission was a series of parties held in Ibiza, in the Balearic Islands of Spain. The events were created by Mike, Andy Manumission (or Mckay) and Dawn Hindle.

== Name ==
The event founders describe Manumission as a lifestyle. The word "manumission" means "release from slavery" and in the party, people were "free to do whatever [they wanted] to do".

== History ==
Manumission started as a mixed gay event held at Club Equinox in January 1994 in the Gay Village, Manchester, UK. It was forced to close due to gang warfare involving drug dealers before moving to the Ku Nightclub, Ibiza later that year. Ku changed its name to Privilege Nightclub in 1995. The events continued until in 2007, and were resumed at Amnesia the same year, before finally ending in 2008.

== See also ==
- Ibiza Rocks, an Ibiza hotel + daytime party led by Andy McKay and Dawn Hindle.
