= Danny Rampling =

Musical artist (born 1961)

- Born: Daniel Rampling; 15 July 1961 (age 65); Streatham, London, England
- Genres: Balearic beat; house
- Occupations: Disc jockey; club owner; record producer
- Years active: 1980s–present
- Label: Maverick
- Website: www.dannyrampling.com

Daniel Rampling (born 15 July 1961) is an English house music DJ and is widely credited as one of the original founders of the UK's rave/club scene.

His long career began in the early 1980s playing hip-hop, soul and funk around numerous bars and clubs in London. Rampling was the first winner of the No 1 DJ in the World Award by DJ Magazine in 1991 and is a three-time DJ Awards recipient. He has reportedly sold over 1 million compilation albums.

== Career ==
=== Early career ===
During a holiday in Ibiza in 1987, Rampling, along with fellow DJs Paul Oakenfold, Nicky Holloway and Johnny Walker, attended Amnesia, a then open air nightclub in San Rafael. At the club the group were introduced to the unique eclectic style of DJ Alfredo, playing, among other genres, the new house music that had been exported from the USA. The group also discovered the music's powerful combination with the drug Ecstasy (MDMA), that reduced inhibitions and created a sense of Oneness on the dance floor.

Upon his return to England, Rampling, along with his then wife, Jenni, attempted to recreate the Ibiza experience by promoting what is regarded as the UK's first Balearic rave club, Shoom. Shoom ran for three years, starting out at a gym in Southwark, London. It was a launching point for acid house culture, while contributing to worldwide dance culture.

=== Later career ===
Danny 'Happy' Rampling played for the original pirate Kiss radio station with the main Saturday night slot in the early 1990s, setting many people up for a great night out with the "Love Groove Dance Party". He, along with others such as Judge Jules, were poached by BBC Radio 1.

In the following years, Rampling continued his career in music as a DJ and producer, while forming a band, The Millionaire Hippies. In November 1994 he joined the BBC, presenting the "Love Groove Dance Party" on BBC Radio 1 until March 2002, making it the second longest running dance music show in radio after Pete Tong's Essential Selection.

The mid-1990s also saw Rampling's DJing style diversify. While still playing house and garage sets, Rampling also began to headline at harder, trancier parties, e.g. 'South', at The Zap Club, in Brighton. Rampling himself referred to his newer style as 'Euro', and at this time showcased new Euro tracks, during the final thirty-minute weekly mix of his Radio 1 Show. Additionally, Rampling's double-disc Love Groove Dance Mix featured house and garage on the first CD, and 'Euro' on the second.

=== Retirement ===
In 2005, Rampling announced his retirement from DJing with the initial intention of running a restaurant, although he changed tack to focus on his property business and the 'low carbon economy'. In 2007 he returned to music and began making some on-off appearances at selected clubs. In 2008 he published a self-help ebook entitled "Everything you need to know about DJing and success". He has since returned to regular DJing. Rampling is a keen eco-entrepreneur and built ten eco-friendly carbon reductive houses in St Leonards-on-Sea, Hastings, East Sussex, England. Along with business partner Simon Hinton they launched 'Green Town Revolution', a reward and offset system to encourage individuals and small businesses to offset their CO_{2} emissions. 'Carbon Neutral DJ' with Norman Jay MBE is GTR's first project.

In an interview with The Guardian in 2009, Rampling said that he was working in property development. While he does still occasionally DJ, Rampling said that "the lifestyle involves a lot of touring, flying around the world, spending weeks away from home and when you have kids it's not easy."

== Controversies ==
Rampling has publicly expressed scepticism about vaccines, particularly those developed for COVID-19. He has shared content on social media platforms that questions the safety and efficacy of vaccines, aligning himself with the broader anti-vaccine movement. This stance has placed him in opposition to mainstream public health recommendations, and has drawn criticism from medical professionals and public health advocates.

Rampling has been criticised more recently for appearing at events such as the Alliance for Responsible Citizenship which some consider as far-right aligned, however, Rampling has questioned that in statements.

== Awards and nominations ==
=== DJ Magazine Awards ===
Artists are nominated to the DJ Magazine top 100 list for each year the public decides who they rank as the World's No 1 DJ at the end of the poll. Rampling was the first winner of this award ranked as the World's No 1 DJ in 1991.

Year	Nominee / work	Award	Result
1991	Danny Rampling	World's Top 100 DJs	1st place

Year	Nominee / work	Award	Result
2013	Danny Rampling	Best of British Outstanding Contribution	Nominated

=== Top 100 DJs ===
Year	Position	Notes	Ref.
1997	7	New Entry	
1998	9	Down 2	
1999	19	Down 10	
2000	13	Up 6	
2001	25	Down 12	
2002	71	Down 46	
2003	61	Up 10	

=== DJ Awards ===
The DJ Awards organizes the annual electronic music DJ awards event it is the only international ceremony for DJs and also the oldest. the awards are held once a year at Pacha club in Ibiza Spain it is one of the most important accolades an artist can win or be honoured by.

Rampling has won the "Best Radio DJ Award" once from three nominations, he also received two special awards one for "Outstanding Achievement" as well as the events highest honour the "Lifetime Achievement Award".

Year	Nominee / work	Award	Result
1998	Danny Rampling	Best Radio DJ	Nominated
1999	Danny Rampling	Best Radio DJ	Nominated
2000	Danny Rampling	Outstanding Achievement	Won
2001	Danny Rampling	Best Radio DJ	Won
2005	Danny Rampling	Lifetime Achievement	Won

=== Mix Mag DMC World Awards ===
Year	Nominee / work	Award	Result
1998	Danny Rampling	Outstanding Contribution	Won

Awards and achievements	DJ Magazine Number 1 DJ; 1991	Succeeded by Smokin Jo
