= Aashish Khan =

Indian musician (1939–2024)

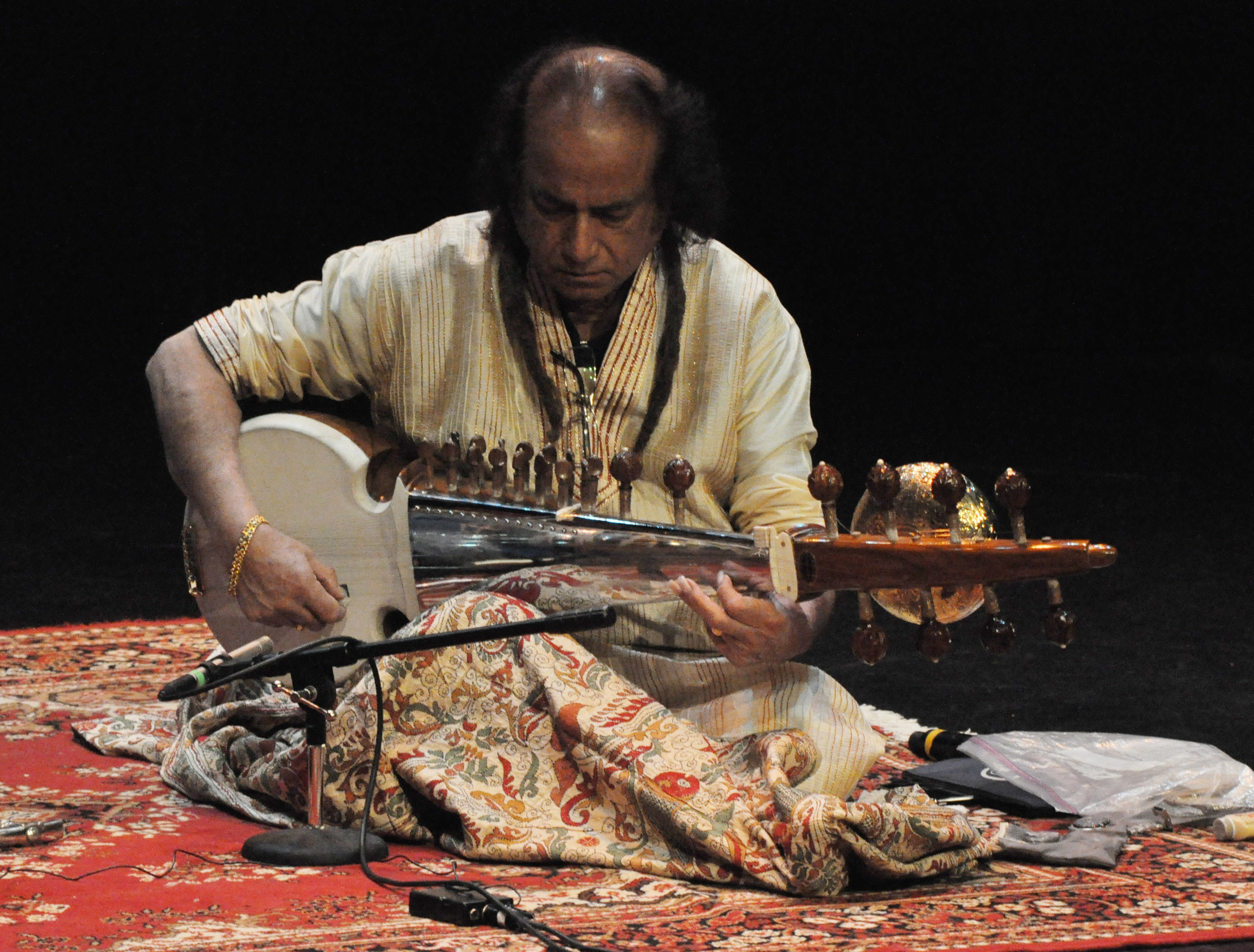
- Khan in 2013

Background information
- Born: 5 December 1939; Maihar, Bundelkhand Agency, British India
- Died: 14 November 2024 (aged 84) Los Angeles, California, U.S.
- Genres: Indian classical; pop; disco
- Occupations: Sarodiya; composer; educator
- Instrument: Sarod
- Years active: 1970–2024

Aashish Khan (5 December 1939 – 14 November 2024) was an Indian classical musician and sarod player. He was also nominated for a Grammy Award in 2006 in the 'Best Traditional World Music Album' category for his album "Golden Strings of the Sarode". He was also a recipient of the Sangeet Natak Akademi Award.

As a grandson of Allauddin Khan, he collaborated with musicians such as Ravi Shankar and The Beatles. Beyond Indian classical music, he and his brother Pranesh Khan also composed disco music for the album Disco Jazz (1982), sung by Rupa Biswas.

== Background ==
Khan was born to a Bengali family in 1939 at Maihar, a small princely state of British India, where his grandfather Alauddin Khan, founder of the "Senia Maihar Gharana" or "Senia Maihar School" of Indian classical music, was a royal court musician.

His mother, the late Zubeida Begum, was Ali Akbar Khan's first wife. He was initiated into Hindustani classical music at the age of five by his grandfather. His training later continued under the guidance of his father, Ali Akbar Khan, and his aunt, Annapurna Devi. He was divorced and had two children, Faraz and Nusrat Khan.

== Career ==
Khan grew up in Maihar and Calcutta performing Indian classical music. He gave his debut public performance at the age of 13, with his grandfather, on the All India Radio "National Program", New Delhi, and in the same year, performed with his father and his grandfather at the "Tansen Music Conference", Calcutta. Khan was also a founder of the Indo-American musical group Shanti with tabla player Ustad Zakir Hussain in 1969 and later of the fusion group, "The Third Eye". In Shanti, Aashish Khan is featured playing the acoustic sarode, sometimes through a guitar amplifier with a vibrato effect.

Under Ravi Shankar, he played on soundtracks for both film and stage, including Oscar winner Satyajit Ray's Apur Sansar, Parash Pathar, Jalsaghar, and Richard Attenborough's film Gandhi. He has also played with Maurice Jarre on John Huston's film, The Man Who Would be King, David Lean's A Passage to India, and composed the music for Tapan Sinha's films, Joturgriha (for which he received the Best Film Score Award) and Aadmi Aurat.

In the early 1980s, he and his brother Pranesh Khan took an interest in disco music following the success of Pakistani pop singer Nazia Hassan. The brothers composed disco music for a project called Disco Jazz, with "Aaj Shanibar" as its showpiece. While in Canada that year, they saw Rupa Biswas perform at the University of Calgary and approached her to perform vocals for the project. The album Disco Jazz was completed in 1981 and released in 1982. Pitchfork noted that the Bengali song "Aaj Shanibar" contains "touches of what would now be considered Balearic beat music, with its expansive and hypnotic musical interludes." During 1989–1990, Khan served as the composer and conductor for the National Orchestra of All India Radio, New Delhi, India.

Khan was a music teacher, later serving as an adjunct professor at both the Indian Classical Music at the California Institute of the Arts, and at the University of California, Santa Cruz. He also taught at the faculties of the Ali Akbar College of Music in San Rafael, California, University of Alberta and the University of Washington. He later divided his time principally between Calcutta and California, where most of his students and disciples were located. He established a school under his name in Kolkata: Aashish Khan School of World Music.

== Collaborations ==
Khan collaborated with John Barham, George Harrison, Ringo Starr, The Beatles, Eric Clapton, Charles Lloyd, John Handy, Alice Coltrane, Emil Richards, Dallas Smith, Don Pope, Jorge Strunz, Ardeshir Farah, and the Philadelphia String Quartet. Ustad Aashish Khan co-led "Shringar" with Andrew McLean, featuring notable New Orleans musicians such as Tim Green and Jason Marsalis. Shringar recordings include Wonderwall Music, Young Master of the Sarode, California Concert, Sarode and Piano Jugalbandi, Shanti, Live at the Royal Festival Hall London, Homage, Inner Voyage, Monsoon Ragas, The Sound of Mughal Court, and Jugalbandi Sarode & Sarangi Duet with Ustad Sultan Khan.

== Recognition ==
Khan was awarded the Fellowship of the Illinois Arts Council, U.S., in 2002 and the Sangeet Natak Akademi award in 2005. In 2006, he was nominated for a Grammy Award in the 'Best Traditional World Music Album' category. On 24 May 2007, Ustad Aashish Khan became the first ever Indian classical musician to become a Fellow of the Royal Asiatic Society of Great Britain and Ireland, the UK's highest society in Asian arts and culture.

== Religious conversion ==
Khan was raised as Muslim before later identifying as Hindu in the 2000s. In September 2006, he announced at a press conference in Calcutta that since his forefathers were Hindu Brahmins of the East Bengal, and held the surname "Debsharma", he wished to use his forefathers' surname to help people understand the root of his musical lineage. He also claimed that his family were never officially converted into Islam and the surname "Khan" did not necessarily imply he was a Muslim. He based this assertion on his grandfather's, the late Ustad Allauddin Khan, biography, Aamar Katha (Bengali), that his forefathers were Hindus with the surname "Debsharma". He also said that his name (Aashish) and his brothers' names (Dhyanesh, Pranesh, Amaresh) were all given by their grandfather, Allauddin.

However, his father, Ali Akbar Khan, rejected Aashish's claims as fallacies. Ali Akbar Khan told the Times of India newspaper in an email: "I do not support his (Aashish's) choice. Unfortunately, many statements made by my son in the newspaper regarding the history of my family are incorrect." He stated that their family has been Muslim for many generations, and will remain Muslims.

== Death ==
Aashish Khan died at a hospital in Los Angeles, California, on 14 November 2024, at the age of 84.

== Discography ==
- Aashish Khan: Inner Voyage; Raga Bhimpalasi (Pilgrimage), Raga Jog (Two Dimensions), Raga Mishra Kafi (Inner Voyage), Raga Mishra Gara (Remembering You), Raga Mishra Abhogi (Love Within), Raga Mishra Kafi (Under The Stars); Keyboards and Producer: Alan Scott Bachman; and Percussion: George Grant. (DDD)
- Aashish Khan: Raga Desh Malhar, Raga Mishra Sivaranjani, Raga Mishra Khamaj. Accompanists: Pranesh Khan in Tabla and Amie Maciszewski in Tanpura. Bihaan Music, Calcutta, India. (DDD)
- Aashish Khan: Peace & Joy: Music For Relaxation; Raga Darbari Kanada, Raga Kaushi. Accompanist: Swapan Chaudhuri in Tabla. Ninaad Records, India (NC 0035). (DDD)
- Aashish Khan & Sultan Khan: Jugalbandi – Sarode & Sarangi Duet; Live in Stuttgart 1995; Raga Shri, Raga Maru Behag, Raga Maand; Tabla: Zakir Hussain, Tanpura: Shefali Nag & Madhuri Chattopadhyay. Chhanda Dhara, Germany (SNCD 70197). (DDD)
- Aashish Khan: Rainy Season Ragas; Raga Desh Malhar – Alap, Jod, Jhala, Raga Mian Ki Malhar – Gat in Tintal, Ragamalika – Gat in Tintal; Tabla: Zakir Hussain, Tanpura: Karuna Eff & Daniela Birschel. Chhanda Dhara, Germany (SNCD 70394). (DDD)
- Aashish Khan & Indranil Bhattacharya: Homage to Our Guru – Jugalbandi; Raga Darbari Kanara – Alap & Jod, Raga Kirwani – Gats in Teental, Raga Khamaj in Thumri Style – Taal in Chanchar; Tabla: Anindo Chatterjee. Chhanda Dhara, Germany (SNCD 70994) & Navras Records, UK. (DDD)
- Aashish Khan: Golden Strings of the Sarode; Raga Bhimpalashi, Raga Bhairavi, Raga Lalitagouri; Tabla: Zakir Hussain. Moment Records, USA (MRCD 1022) & Music Today, India. (DDD)

With George Harrison:

- Wonderwall Music (1968)
- Young Master of the Sarod (1967); Raga Lalit (raga), Raga Yaman (raga)
