= The Big 80's =

Original release
- Network: VH1

The Big 80's is a 1980s nostalgia series of music videos broadcast on VH1 starting in 1994 and sporadically airing until 2000. The show ran for 90 minutes.

== History ==
The show started at the end of 1994. By 1997, it was regularly ranked among VH1's most watched shows.

== Reception ==
The Daily Oklahoman television critic Sandi Davis said that VH1 The Big 80's, a 1996 compilation album of 15 of the program's most popular songs, is "a sure crowd pleaser at parties for those who recall the days of gaudy clothes and makeup". Nisid Hajari of the Entertainment Weekly wrote of the compilation, "the musical equivalent of a fluff video — 15 songs that share the polished, electronic sheen of TV. That tinny drum-track abandon can provide a refreshing, lighthearted break from the current miasma of geeks with guitars."
