= Now That's What I Call the 80s 2 =

Now That's What I Call the 80s Volume 2

Compilation album by Various artists
- Released: June 30, 2009
- Recorded: 1981–1989
- Genre: Pop
- Length: 78:41

Series chronology
Now That's What I Call Music! 31 (2009)	Now That's What I Call the 80s Volume 2 (2009)	Now That's What I Call Country Volume 2 (2009)

Professional ratings
Review scores
Source	Rating
AllMusic	3/5 stars

Now That's What I Call the 80s Volume 2 is a special edition compilation album from the (U.S.) Now! series released on June 30, 2009. The album is the series' second compilation of pop music hits of the 1980s. It debuted on the Billboard 200 album chart at number 37.

Most of the tracks on the album are from the latter half of the 1980s. Included in the lineup are nine songs that topped the Billboard Hot 100 from The Human League, Duran Duran, Whitney Houston, Cyndi Lauper, Bruce Hornsby and the Range, George Michael, Rick Astley, Paula Abdul and Martika.

== Track listing ==
No.	Title	Artist	Length
1.	"Faith"	George Michael	3:12
2.	"How Will I Know"	Whitney Houston	4:32
3.	"Straight Up"	Paula Abdul	4:07
4.	"Never Gonna Give You Up"	Rick Astley	3:30
5.	"Dancing on the Ceiling"	Lionel Richie	4:33
6.	"Torture"	The Jacksons	4:52
7.	"Simply Irresistible"	Robert Palmer	4:13
8.	"Don't Mean Nothing"	Richard Marx	4:39
9.	"Run to You"	Bryan Adams	3:51
10.	"Every Little Thing She Does Is Magic"	The Police	4:20
11.	"The Way It Is"	Bruce Hornsby and the Range	4:56
12.	"Separate Ways (Worlds Apart)"	Journey	5:24
13.	"True Colors"	Cyndi Lauper	3:45
14.	"Toy Soldiers"	Martika	4:18
15.	"A View to a Kill"	Duran Duran	3:32
16.	"You Spin Me Round (Like a Record)"	Dead or Alive	3:13
17.	"Rebel Yell"	Billy Idol	3:42
18.	"Don't You Want Me"	The Human League	3:56
19.	"Somebody's Watching Me"	Rockwell	3:59

== See also ==
- Now That's What I Call the 80s (American series)
