= Ibiza Rocks =

Hotel on the island of Ibiza

Ibiza Rocks Hotel
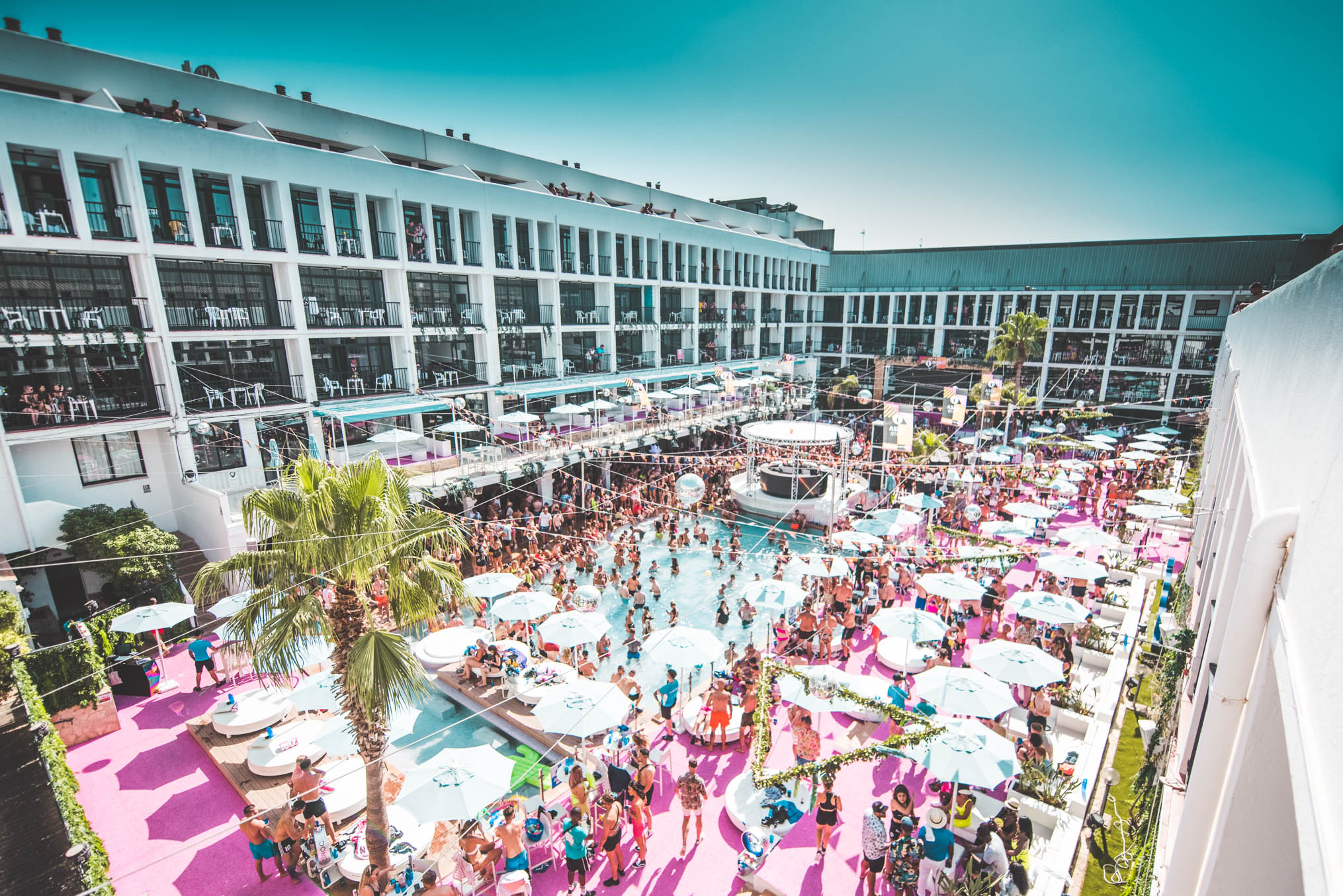

- Location within Ibiza
- Hotel chain: Ibiza Rocks

General information
- Location: Sant Antoni de Portmany, Ibiza, Balearic Islands, Spain., Carrer de Cervantes, 27, 07820 Sant Antoni de Portmany, Illes Balears, Spain
- Coordinates: 38°58′58.84″N 1°17′59.01″E
- Opening: 1998 (Re-named in 2008)
- Owner: Andy McKay and Dawn Hindle
- Management: Ibiza Rocks Group

Technical details
- Floor count: 4

Other information
- Number of rooms: 368
- Number of restaurants: 3 (Surfriders Grill, Ziggy's Pizza, Lobby Bar)
- Parking: No

Website
- http://www.ibizarocks.com/hotel/

Ibiza Rocks Hotel is a hotel operated by Ibiza Rocks in the centre of the town of Sant Antoni de Portmany, on the Spanish island of Ibiza. The hotel is built around a central courtyard with a pool, bar and stage for events in the center. Formerly called Club Paraiso Mediterraneo, the hotel is on the Carrer de Cervantes, in the central area of Sant Antonio.

== Location ==
The Hotel is within centre of Sant Antoni de Portmany. It is 10.8 miles (17.4 km) north west of Ibiza Town.

== History ==
Club Paraiso Mediterraneo was first opened in 1998 as an apartment hotel with 368 units and had a Spanish 3 star rating. In 2008 the Hotel was bought by the Ibiza Rocks organization (led by British couple Andy McKay and Dawn Hindle of Manumission fame) with a different ethos to the original apartment hotel complex. Renamed the Ibiza Rocks Hotel, the hotel began hosting live music events with bands and DJs on its poolside main stage.

The hotel has hosted many big name performers including David Guetta, Swedish House Mafia, Ed Sheeran, Craig David, Joel Corry, Rudimental, Jax Jones, Anne-Marie, MK, James Arthur, John Newman, Becky Hill, Beady Eye, Ella Henderson, Bastille, Example, Sigma, Pete Tong, Fatboy Slim, Idris Elba, Danny Howard, Nathan Dawe and Gok Wan. Some of them, such as Dua Lipa, were hired before widespread success.

== Concept ==
The hotel hosts regular events in a central courtyard. The hotel room rate includes entrance to the event. Guests are young people mainly from the United Kingdom and Ireland. The Ibiza Rocks organization has extended the concept of hotel + daytime party to the Ushuaïa Ibiza Beach Hotel and Mallorca Rocks with the help of the Balearic family Matutes.

== Criticism ==
Sant Antoni neighbors residing near the hotel have complained about the noise from the parties and the drunk and vomiting guests. In 2022 , a guest suffered chemical submission and sexual abuse in one of the hotel rooms. In April 2025, a 19-year-old tourist fell from a balcony while partying (locally known as balconing). It was the first balconing death in the Balearic islands that year. Following this, two British men, a 26-year old and another 19-year-old fell from their balconies at the hotel, both within two weeks of each other in July 2025, which resulted in the hotel suspending their events programme.
