= Balearic trance =

Musical subgenre

- Stylistic origins: Trance; Balearic beat; electronic; Mediterranean music
- Cultural origins: 1990s, Balearic Islands, Spain
- Typical instruments: Synthesizer; drum machine; sequencer; sampler; keyboard; PC

Other topics
- Tropical house

Balearic trance, also known as Ibiza trance, is a trance music subgenre which evolved from Balearic beat. The earliest known Balearic trance compositions date back to a few years after the emergence of Balearic beat in the 1990s.

== History ==
It came out of Balearic house in the 1980s, and named after the Balearic island of Ibiza. Inconsistently, the style name has always been connected to trance and Balearic beat.

== Style ==
Balearic trance keeps the same "Balearic" timbre as Balearic beat, while Balearic trance is characterized by a higher tempo of around 125 bpm to 145 bpm, typically around 130 bpm. Being based in Spain, it is often derived from Latin music. It has a primary focus on atmosphere, making it similar in many regards to dream trance.

"This music seems to capture the mood of a soft, Mediterranean sunset perfectly, maybe because of its use of string instruments, like Spanish guitars and mandolins and things associated with the Mediterranean, like oceans, birds, and other things borrowed from ambient trance."

== See also ==
- Balearic beat
- Progressive house
