= José Antonio Santamaría =

Spanish footballer (1946–1993)

Personal information
- Full name: José Antonio Santamaría Vaqueriza
- Date of birth: 16 March 1946
- Place of birth: San Sebastián, Spain
- Date of death: 19 January 1993 (aged 46)
- Place of death: San Sebastián
- Height: 1.77 m (5 ft 10 in)
- Position: Defender

Senior career*
Years	Team	Apps	(Gls)
1963–1964	Eibar		
1964–1967	San Sebastián		
1967–1971	Real Sociedad	36	(2)
1971–1974	Hércules	66	(2)
1974–1975	Sabadell	32	(0)
- * Club domestic league appearances and goals

José Antonio Santamaría Vaqueriza (16 March 1946 – 19 January 1993) was a Spanish footballer. After retiring from football he had a career as an entrepreneur in the hospitality sector. He was murdered in a terrorist attack at the age of 46.

== Playing career ==
During his career as a professional, he played for SD Eibar (1963 to 1964), San Sebastián – reserve team of Real Sociedad – (1964 to 1967), the aforementioned club's first team (1967 to 1971), Hércules CF (1971 to 1974) and finished his career at CE Sabadell FC (1974 to 1975).

=== International ===
Santamaría played for his country at the under-23 level and was shortlisted to play for the senior team on several occasions.

== After football ==
After retiring from football, Santamaría with other partners opened a nightclub in San Sebastián called the Ku Nightclub. This club was a great success and would become one of the hottest spots in town. In 1978, along with two other partners, he expanded the Ku franchise to the island of Ibiza, acquiring and expanding existing premises that would become known as Ku club Ibiza (Now Privilege Ibiza). During the 1980s, the open-air Ku Club Ibiza became one of the most famous and fashionable 'super clubs'in the world, even being included in the Guinness Book of Records. Santamaría had among his personal friends personalities such as the film director Roman Polanski, who at that time had a house in Ibiza.

He was killed in an attack committed by ETA in 1993.
