= Rupa Biswas =

Indian singer

- Born: 1955 (age 70–71); Malda Town, West Bengal, India
- Occupation: Singer

Rupa Biswas is an Indian singer who is known for her singular Disco Jazz album. In 2026, the Bengali-language song “Aaj Shanibar” was included in the soundtrack of Grand Theft Auto VI and featured on the game’s radio station Worldwide FM.

== Early Life ==
She was born as Sukla Biswas in 1955, in Malda Town, West Bengal, India. Biswas was married to Udayan and has a son Debayan.

== Career & Works ==
Her one and only album, Disco Jazz, was released in 1982, shortly after her father took the family on a holiday to Canada in 1981.

In 1981, at the University of Calgary's Boris Roubakine Hall, she sang geets and ghazals for three hours to an audience which included musicians such as Aashish Khan (later a Grammy Award nominee) and his tabla-playing brother Pranesh Khan, who were grandsons of Allauddin Khan and former collaborators with Ravi Shankar and George Harrison of The Beatles. Aashish and Pranesh Khan had taken an interest in disco music following the success of Pakistani pop singer Nazia Hassan. The Khan brothers had composed disco music for a project called Disco Jazz. After watching Rupa's performance, the Khan brothers approached her to perform vocals for the project.

The Khan brothers produced her first album Disco Jazz, which was completed in 1981 and released in 1982. The song "Aaj Shanibar" (transl. "Today's Saturday") was mostly sung in the Bengali language, along with some Hindi. She was given vocals written by Aashish Khan's wife Firoza Khan and a cordless mic, which she had never seen before. Rupa was used to wearing traditional Indian clothing and all this was a new experience for her. For the album cover image, she chose a dress which she found in the kids' section of a department store and decided to go with a haircut that she still uses today.

After recording her vocals, she spent time in the United Kingdom with her brother Chandan, who later paid for all her recordings. In 1982, Rupa sold a handful of copies of Disco Jazz and soon faded into anonymity. The album disappeared from circulation.

For a long time Rupa remained away from the public eye until her work was rediscovered by Indian filmmaker Ashim Ahluwalia, who owned a rare vinyl copy and selected the tracks "Aaj Shanibar", "Moja Bhari Moja", and "Ayee Morshume Be-Reham Duniya" for the soundtrack of his film, Miss Lovely, which competed in the Un Certain Regard section at the 2012 Cannes Film Festival. It was also released unofficially on a German record label, Ovular.

In 2014, Rupa's son, Debayan Sen, discovered an album inside his house in Kolkata, India. The album featured a picture of his mother, leading to the discovery of her buried musical career. On Google, Sen discovered that the album Disco Jazz was a rarity, selling at high prices on websites such as Discogs and was already viewed by millions on YouTube. Pitchfork compared "Aaj Shanibar" to Balearic beat music, a style of house music, stating it contains "touches of what would now be considered Balearic beat music, with its expansive and hypnotic musical interludes."

In April 2016, Fran Korzatowski, a music fan based in Albany, New York, identified the song "Aaj Shanibar" based on the Miss Lovely end credits and later uploaded it to YouTube. A few months later, Dan Snaith discovered Aaj Shanibar on YouTube and immediately selected it for his live DJ sets and radio broadcasts on NTS and Gilles Peterson's Worldwide FM. Since then, the album has been re-issued by The Numero Group, a well-established archival record label. The song has been used by Loewe in Paula's Ibiza 2020 advertising campaign and by Netflix in the television series Cowboy Bebop (2021). The song “Aaj Shanibar” has been featured on the in-game radio station, Worldwide FM, in the 2026 action-adventure video game, Grand Theft Auto VI.

== Discography ==
Albums

- Disco Jazz

Songs

- "Aaj Shanibar"
- "Moja Bhari Moja"
- "Ayee Morshume Be‐reham Duniya"
- "East West Shuffle"
