= Showa American Story =

- Developer: Nekcom
- Publishers: 4Divinity; 2P Games
- Directors: Xiangyu Luo; Jensen Fang
- Producers: Xiangyu Luo; Jensen Fang
- Engine: Unreal Engine 5
- Platforms: PlayStation 5 Windows
- Release: 2026
- Genre: Action role-playing
- Mode: Single-player

Showa American Story (Note: Simplified Chinese: 昭和米国物语; traditional Chinese: 昭和米國物語; Japanese: 昭和米国物語.) is an upcoming action role-playing game developed by the Chinese studio Nekcom. The player assumes the role of Choko Chigusa, a stuntwoman, who resurrects from the dead and navigates post-apocalyptic Showa America. The story explores an alternate history in which the United States has radically changed under Japanese economic and cultural influence. The developers drew inspiration from Japanese and American popular culture of the eighties and nineties, as experienced in Chinese society at the time.

Showa American Story is scheduled to be released for PlayStation 5 and Windows in 2026.

== Gameplay ==
Showa American Story is an action role-playing game. However, it is defined simply as a role-playing game by Nekcom. It is played in single-player mode from a third-person perspective.

The player controls Choko Chigusa. She can wield melee and ranged weapons. Rage builds up by dealing or taking damage, which results in rage points. These points are used to perform ultimate abilities, rage attacks (a better variant of a heavy attack), chain attacks (an instant weapon swap followed by either an attack with a melee weapon or bullet time with a firearm), perfect dodges & super recoveries (a dodge followed by a counterattack), and super recoveries (a counterattack right after being hit by an enemy heavy attack). Furthermore, stamina is consumed by light attacks and accumulated by landing rage attacks. If the stamina is fully depleted, the defense will be lower and more damage will therefore be taken. The enemy's stamina reduces by landing rage and chain attacks. If it breaks, an execution is enabled.

One of the enemy bosses is Gokou, the Governor of Texas, who is both an American cowboy and a Japanese samurai.

The game takes place in a semi-open world. It consists of multiple cities, each of which is its own sandbox. A camper, a motorcycle, and other ways of transport are available. The traversal between cities is done using the camper, either through fast travel or by driving. The camper serves as the base of operations.

The character is leveled up by obtaining experience points through combat. This increases stats and provides battle points that are used to unlock skills. Action points are obtained through looting, talking to non-player characters, and engaging in a broad range of other pursuits during exploration. They are spent on activities, each of which increases specific stats, at the camper. The stats are further modified by equipping accessories. Furthermore, weapons are leveled up at the cost of United States dollars (the in-game currency) and enhancement parts, which increases their stats.

There are different outfits to change the character's appearance.

The game features a linear main story. It also has side stories and minigames, which gradually become available as the main story progresses.

The game has multiple difficulty options, namely Reiwa Baby, Heisei NEET, and Showa Man in ascending order of challenge.

== Synopsis ==
=== Setting ===
Showa American Story takes place in post-apocalyptic Showa America. Its events unfold in the 66th year of the Showa era, which corresponds to the year 1991.

The setting is presented as an alternate history. In this world, Japan has bought out much of the United States through its strong economic power, while a surge of immigration by its people has led to an amalgamation of the two cultures into a new way of life in the United States. The United States has essentially become an economic and cultural colony of Japan. This scenario imagines a situation in which Japan's economic bubble did not collapse.

=== Plot ===
Choko Chigusa, a 19-year-old stuntwoman, travels with her younger sister Aya to Neo Yokohama, formerly known as Los Angeles, to audition for an action movie. Shortly after arrival at the airport, Choko is assassinated and buried in the wilderness outside the city by a group of mysterious men in black. Meanwhile, Aya is taken away by the men. However, Choko resurrects from the dead and discovers that America has changed into a post-apocalyptic landscape populated with zombies, monsters, and other human survivors. In order to find her missing sister, uncover the truth, and exact revenge, she embarks on a journey across America.

== Development ==
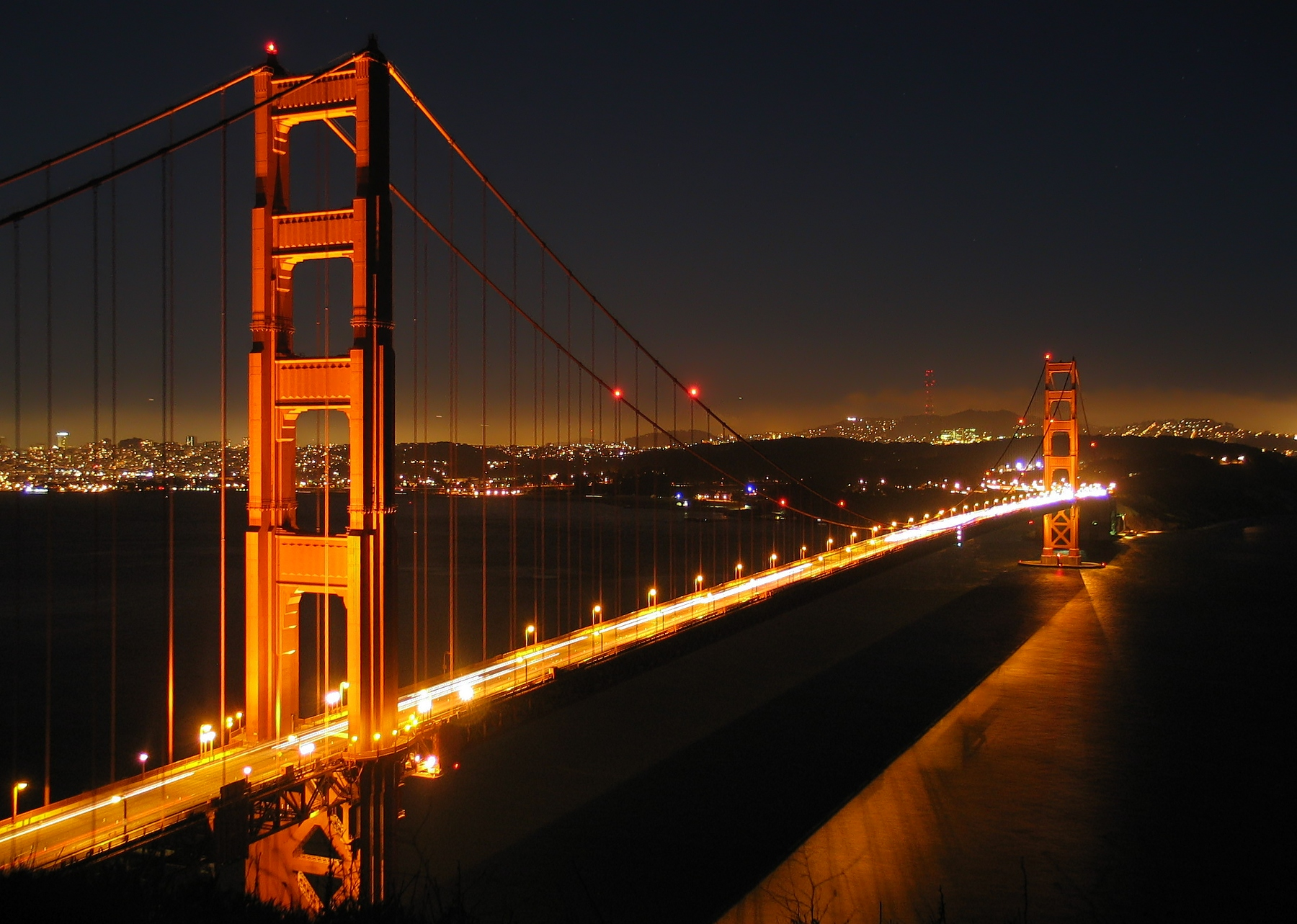
One of the reimagined American landmarks is the Golden Gate Bridge adorned with Japanese lanterns and shimenawa.

Showa American Story is a game developed by Nekcom, and published by 4Divinity and 2P Games. Nekcom is based in Wuhan, China.

Nekcom started the development of Showa American Story in 2016. The conceptual design happened from 2016 to 2018. The project involved up to five people during this stage. The development entered its official phase in the second half of 2018. The game was built initially on Unreal Engine 4 and subsequently on Unreal Engine 5.

Showa American Story was based on Japanese and American popular culture of the eighties and nineties, as approached from a Chinese perspective. At the time, these foreign cultures were introduced to China and appeared in distinct ways within its society. The developers derived cultural references from their own memories, rather than from research or consultation. Xiangyu Luo commented that "I used Japanese manga, movies, and the like that were popular in China as my base. I thought it would be more interesting to show people a unique take on Showa style as seen by a Chinese person than it would be if we depicted it faithfully. While I was confident that Chinese users who experienced the same timeframe and creative works as me would understand the charm, I never imagined I'd get this big of a reaction from Japan and the West."

The developers set out to create a game that depicts a version of the United States that has been radically changed under the influence of Japan during the eighties, a concept that inverts the dynamic of the era in the opposite direction. They intended to convey a sense of nostalgia for the Showa era. Although they considered a cyberpunk theme, they concluded that science fiction elements would detract from their portrayal of a setting rooted in the period and decided to exclude elements deemed extraneous to the nostalgic tone. Furthermore, they adopted a style inspired by B-movies. For example, recurring elements included the cinematic genre's straightforward violence and dark humor.

A game prototype with a 45° top-down perspective was initially created, but it was deemed insufficiently expressive for the game's subject matter. Therefore, following an assessment of the costs and feasibility, the direction shifted toward a game with a third-person perspective.

Each character design was either drawn by hand or based on a 3D facial model. The protagonist Choko Chigusa was featured with a mosaic effect over her face in the 2024 trailer, because her design was not finalized and thus could not be shown at the time.

The Japanese voice cast included Yoko Hikasa as Choko Chigusa, Hideo Ishikawa as Michael Hero, Hōchū Ōtsuka as Bubba, and Hikaru Midorikawa as Akitora Mutsuki.

Japanese songs were selected and licensed for the game. The ideas for the song choices naturally emerged from Luo's memories and preferences, rather than through a deliberate search. "Sorega Daiji" by the Daijiman Brothers Band became the game's theme song. Luo encountered the song by chance on a playlist, which brought back memories. He had listened to it frequently in the past and remembered it as a song with the power to encourage people who were left discouraged following the collapse of Japan's economic bubble. He therefore felt that it was a right fit for the game and ideal as the game's theme song. In addition, original songs were created for the game.

The development cost of Showa American Story was about US$20 million, a preliminary figure given by Luo in late 2024.

== Release ==
Showa American Story is scheduled to be released for PC and PlayStation 5 in 2026.

In January 2022, Nekcom unveiled Showa American Story. At the time, the game was announced for PC, PlayStation 4, and PlayStation 5. Starting a few days earlier in that month, the studio teased the project under the title Project SAS with a daily countdown toward the reveal. In November 2024, the studio revealed that the game would be released for PC and PlayStation 5 in 2025. However, in November 2025, the studio stated that the release was moved to 2026.

== Reception ==
=== Accolades ===
Showa American Story won Phenomenon of the Year, and was also nominated for Most Anticipated Game and Surprise of the Year at the UCG Game Awards 2024.
