= Nicky Holloway =

English DJ

- Born: Nicholas Holloway; 12 June 1963 (age 62); Isleworth, London, England
- Genres: Balearic beat; trance; progressive trance
- Occupations: DJ; producer
- Years active: 1980–present

Nicholas Holloway (born 12 June 1963) is an English DJ and record producer, who rose to fame in the 1980s and 1990s, and has been called "a prototype of the superstar DJ".

== Biography ==
Nicholas Holloway was born in Isleworth, London. He began playing records in the disco pub scene around the Old Kent Road in 1980. He first started to organise club nights, such as Special Branch in London Bridge in 1984 alongside Pete Tong and Gilles Peterson.

Holloway (with Paul Oakenfold, Johnny Walker and Danny Rampling) was one of the "Ibiza four" - four DJs who travelled to the island for a holiday in the summer of 1987. They visited a club called Amnesia and met an Argentine DJ called Alfredo Fiorito, who inspired them to promote Balearic beats back in the UK.

Holloway opened the clubnight Trip at the London Astoria in Charing Cross Road at the end of May 1988, and was one of the first legal acid house clubs. Trip changed its name to Sin, after the previous name's close association with drug culture.

In April 1990, he opened the Milk Bar venue at 12 Sutton Row, London, W1.

During the summer of 1992, he opened venues in Ibiza under the Milk Bar banner which ran for a couple of seasons, but later went bankrupt and had to attend rehabilitation.

Pete Tong, Paul Oakenfold, Lynn Cosgrove and Lincoln Cheng a club owner of Zouk (club) in Singapore all chipped in to get him into the Charter Nightingale rehab clinic and for seven years he remained sober.

Since cleaning his life up in 1998, Holloway has continued to produce music and is widely known as one of the first DJs in the UK to go digital, many of his Peers mocked him for this, however they soon realised the benefits outweighed the downside and within a few years were doing the same. Maverick producer Arthur Baker walked into his own club one night, The Elbow Room in Islington and was blown away by what he saw Nicky doing using a piece of software called PCDJ at that time laptop hard drives were too small so he had to carry around a full desktop PC.

In 1999, Holloway helped create a DJ based website called Trust The DJ with his close friend Lynn Cosgrove, which was so ahead of its time it ran out of funding before most people had broadband. Lynn Cosgrove still manages DJ Carl Cox.

In 2008, Holloway started to run classic house club nights under the name of Desert Island Disco however after a few good years decided to stop doing the events as the format was being copied by many other promoters and he simply got bored.

After a few years living in a pub called the Queens Head in Brixton, Holloway is now currently living in Barnet, north London and now organizes parties called Now & Then where the format is new and old music and still plays regularly for such events as Promised Land & Summer Solstice. He was recently included in a list of 50 DJs over 50 still cutting it.

== Discography ==
=== Singles ===
- 1988: Beats Workin - "Sure Beats Workin'" (FFRR)
- 1989: Beats Workin - "Burn Out Don't Fade Away" (FFRR)
- 1995: Velvet Underpants - "Where Is My Man" (SL2)
- 1996: Beats Workin - "Don't Keep Me Waiting" (White Label)
- 1997: NWA vs. Oasis - "Wonderwall" (White Label)
- 1998: Sir Real - "Spirits High" (White Label)
- 2002: Holloway & Co.- "Voyager"
- 2002: Beats Workin - "Everyway But Loose"
- 2002: Titty Twister - "Pussy Blowout"

=== Compilation albums ===
- 1995: Ibiza 95 (Forgotten)
- 1996: Decade of Ibiza (Telstar)
- 1997: Hog Zone Promo Compilation
- 1998: 555 Promo Compilation
