= Now That's What I Call the 80s (American series) =

Compilation album by Various artists
- Released: March 11, 2008
- Genre: Pop
- Length: 79:55
- Label: Sony

Series chronology
Now That's What I Call Music! Vol. 27 (2008)	Now That's What I Call the 80s (2008)	Now That's What I Call Music! Vol. 28 (2008)

Deluxe edition cover
- The Deluxe iTunes edition of the album

Professional ratings
Review scores
Source	Rating
Allmusic	3.5/5 stars

Now That's What I Call the 80s is a special edition compilation album from the Now! series in the United States, containing hit songs from the 1980s. It was released on March 11, 2008. In addition to a traditional CD release, an 80-track "deluxe digital edition" was made available for download only on iTunes.

The album debuted at number 11 on the Billboard 200 album chart, selling just under 34,000 copies in its first week. Sales of the deluxe edition are counted separately.

== Track listing ==
1. Michael Jackson – "Billie Jean"
2. Billy Joel – "Uptown Girl"
3. Wham! – "Wake Me Up Before You Go-Go"
4. Cyndi Lauper – "Girls Just Want to Have Fun"
5. Duran Duran – "Hungry Like the Wolf"
6. Simple Minds – "Don't You (Forget About Me)"
7. The Fixx – "One Thing Leads to Another"
8. Steve Miller – "Abracadabra"
9. Bob Seger – "Shakedown"
10. The Police – "Every Breath You Take"
11. Whitesnake – "Here I Go Again"
12. Survivor – "Eye of the Tiger"
13. Herbie Hancock – "Rockit"
14. David Bowie – "Let's Dance"
15. Men at Work – "Who Can It Be Now?"
16. Tears for Fears – "Everybody Wants to Rule the World"
17. Rick Springfield – "Jessie's Girl"
18. Bryan Adams – "Heaven"
19. Heart – "What About Love"
20. Bonnie Tyler – "Total Eclipse of the Heart"

== Track listing (deluxe digital edition) ==
1. Michael Jackson – "Billie Jean" (1983)
2. M – "Pop Muzik" (1980)
3. Rupert Holmes – "Escape (The Pina Colada Song)" (1980)
4. The Buggles – "Video Killed the Radio Star" (1980)
5. Blondie – "Call Me" (1980)
6. The Romantics – "What I Like About You" (1980)
7. Pat Benatar – "Hit Me with Your Best Shot" (1980)
8. Kool & the Gang – "Celebration" (1980)
9. REO Speedwagon – "Keep on Loving You" (1981)
10. Kim Carnes – "Bette Davis Eyes" (1981)
11. Rick Springfield – "Jessie's Girl" (1981)
12. Hall & Oates – "You Make My Dreams" (1981)
13. Billy Squier – "The Stroke" (1981)
14. Juice Newton – "Queen of Hearts" (1981)
15. Red Rider – "Lunatic Fringe" (1981)
16. The J. Geils Band – "Centerfold" (1982)
17. Tommy Tutone – "867-5309/Jenny" (1982)
18. The Go-Go's – "We Got the Beat" (1982)
19. The Human League – "Don't You Want Me" (1982)
20. The Motels – "Only the Lonely" (1982)
21. Steve Miller – "Abracadabra" (1982)
22. Survivor – "Eye of the Tiger" (1982)
23. Missing Persons – "Words" (1982)
24. A Flock of Seagulls – "I Ran (So Far Away)" (1982)
25. Toni Basil – "Mickey" (1982)
26. The Pointer Sisters – "I'm So Excited" (1982)
27. Stray Cats – "Rock This Town" (1982)
28. Marvin Gaye – "Sexual Healing" (1982)
29. Toto – "Africa" (1983)
30. Frida – "I Know There's Something Going On" (1983)
31. Culture Club – "Do You Really Want to Hurt Me" (1983)
32. Duran Duran – "Hungry Like the Wolf" (1983)
33. Thomas Dolby – "She Blinded Me with Science" (1983)
34. David Bowie – "Let's Dance" (1983)
35. The Tubes – "She's a Beauty" (1983)
36. Kajagoogoo – "Too Shy" (1983)
37. Bonnie Tyler – "Total Eclipse of the Heart" (1983)
38. Men Without Hats – "The Safety Dance" (1983)
39. Spandau Ballet – "True" (1983)
40. The Fixx – "One Thing Leads to Another" (1983)
41. Herbie Hancock – "Rockit" (1983)
42. Lionel Richie – "All Night Long (All Night)" (1983)
43. Billy Joel – "Uptown Girl" (1983)
44. Cyndi Lauper – "Girls Just Want to Have Fun" (1984)
45. Billy Idol – "Rebel Yell" (1984)
46. Kenny Loggins – "Footloose" (1984)
47. Berlin – "No More Words" (1984)
48. Night Ranger – "Sister Christian" (1984)
49. Dan Hartman – "I Can Dream About You" (1984)
50. Tina Turner – "What's Love Got to Do with It" (1984)
51. Corey Hart – "Sunglasses at Night" (1984)
52. John Waite – "Missing You" (1984)
53. Wham! – "Wake Me Up Before You Go-Go" (1984)
54. Animotion – "Obsession" (1985)
55. Simple Minds – "Don't You (Forget About Me)" (1985)
56. Tears for Fears – "Everybody Wants to Rule the World" (1985)
57. Katrina and the Waves – "Walking on Sunshine" (1985)
58. Heart – "What About Love" (1985)
59. Huey Lewis and the News – "The Power of Love" (1985)
60. Ready for the World – "Oh Sheila" (1985)
61. Starship – "We Built This City" (1985)
62. Mr. Mister – "Broken Wings" (1986)
63. Miami Sound Machine – "Conga" (1986)
64. Robert Palmer – "Addicted to Love" (1986)
65. Level 42 – "Something About You" (1986)
66. The Outfield – "Your Love" (1986)
67. Steve Winwood – "Higher Love" (1986)
68. Cameo – "Word Up!" (1986)
69. The Bangles – "Walk Like an Egyptian" (1987)
70. Wang Chung – "Everybody Have Fun Tonight" (1987)
71. Cutting Crew – "(I Just) Died in Your Arms" (1987)
72. Lisa Lisa and Cult Jam – "Head to Toe" (1987)
73. Whitesnake – "Here I Go Again" (1987)
74. Belinda Carlisle – "Heaven Is a Place on Earth" (1987)
75. Salt-n-Pepa – "Push It" (1987)
76. Breathe – "Hands to Heaven" (1987)
77. Bobby McFerrin – "Don't Worry, Be Happy" (1988)
78. Poison – "Every Rose Has Its Thorn" (1988)
79. Paula Abdul – "Straight Up" (1988)
80. Great White – "Once Bitten, Twice Shy" (1989)

== See also ==
- Now That's What I Call the 80s 2
