= Privilege Ibiza =

Nightclub in Ibiza

Coordinates: 38°57′28″N 1°24′29″E

Privilege
- Privilege nightclub
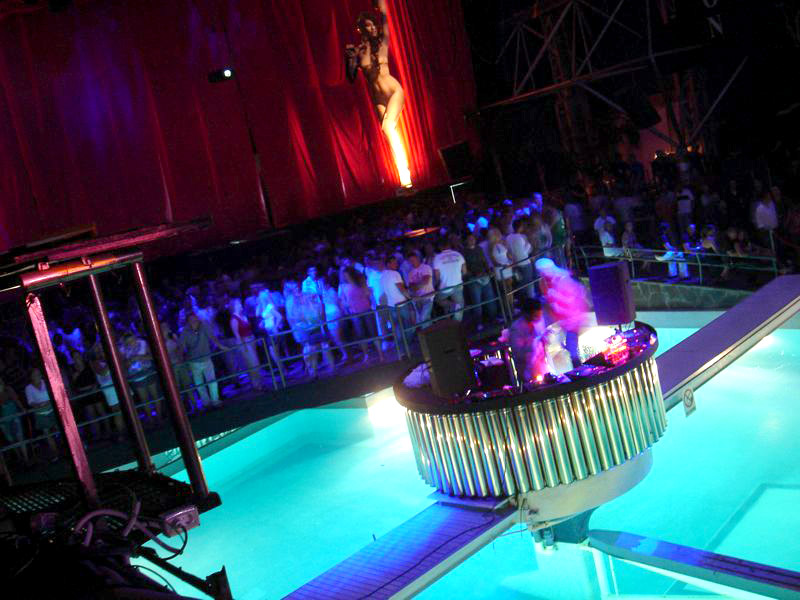
- Interactive map of Privilege
- Former names: Ku
- Location: San Rafael, Ibiza, Spain
- Owner: Jose Maria Etxaniz
- Capacity: 10,000
- Type: Nightclub, music venue
- Events: Electronic dance music, live music, performance art
- Record attendance: 10,000

Construction
- Opened: 1978
- Renovated: 1995
- Expanded: 1997
- Closed: 2019

Website
- Official website

Privilege Ibiza, originally known as Ku Club (1979–95), was a music venue and nightclub in Ibiza until its closure in 2019. It was awarded the "world's largest nightclub" according to the Guinness Book of Records, and was defined as a superclub with a capacity of 10,000 people and encompassing 6,500 m² (69,940 ft²). It was located close to the village of Sant Rafael de Sa Creu on the Spanish island of Ibiza, less than one kilometre (0.6 miles) from the nightclub Amnesia.

It remained closed after the summer of 2019 and in 2024 UNVRS was announced to be opening on the site where Privilege had previously operated.

== History ==
The history of Privilege began in the early 1970s when it started out as a restaurant, then expanded to include a bar and a community swimming pool. It was then known as Club San Rafael. In 1979, the venue was sold to the Real Sociedad footballer José Antonio Santamaría, together with the creative team of Brasilio de Oliviera (founder of La Troya Asesina, one of Ibiza's longest running nights) and Gorri. The venue then changed its name to KU, after the name of a god from Hawaiian mythology (see Kū). The appeal of the club was such that it commissioned a medium-length film showcasing the many wonders of Ibizan landscapes and nightlife in the mid-eighties.

Throughout the 1980s, KU Club earned a reputation initially as Europe's premier polysexual but predominately gay nightspot and was compared to an open-air version of the famous Studio 54 in New York. It staged spectacular parties in the main room, which was organized around a swimming pool and a statue of Ku. The venue was also where the video to "Barcelona" by Freddie Mercury and Montserrat Caballé was filmed on 30 May 1987. It hosted early live performances by groups such as Duran Duran, Spandau Ballet and Kid Creole and the Coconuts. The club featured in a Channel 4 documentary called A Short Film about Chilling, which labelled KU as "the mirror of Ibiza". A group of fashion designers called Locomía had shows at KU. After being discovered there, they went on to become a highly successful recording project. The open-air parties came to an end when legislation forced many of the greater clubs in Ibiza to cover their dancefloors in the early 1990s. Nevertheless, the sheer size of the venue gave rise to the claim of it being the size of an aircraft hangar with a 25-metre (82 ft) high roof.

The club continued with the KU Club name until 1995 before becoming known as Privilege, after a change of ownership to Jose Maria Etxaniz. In 1994, it hosted Manumission, one of the island's most famous events. In 1998, La Vaca Asesina moved to Amnesia and was renamed La Troya Asesina. After a dispute between the club owner and Manumission's organizers in 2005, the event ended in 2006. La Troya Asesina moved to Space in 2006.

== Venue ==
According to official statistics published in the 2003 edition of Guinness World Records, Privilege was by far the world's largest nightclub covering an area of 69,968 sq ft (6,500 m^{2}) and holding 10,000 clubbers. Designated areas of the club included the Coco Loco bar area, and the La Vaca dance area (later known as the Vista Club).

== Resident DJs ==
Resident DJs included:

- Adam Beyer
- Ben Klock
- Carl Cox
- Marcel Dettmann
- Jayda G
- Alex P
- Deborah De Luca
- Dennis Cruz
- Sindey Charles
- The Blessed Madonna
- Young Marco
- Luca Donzelli
- Jamie Jones
- Seb Zito
- Michael Bibi

== Live performances ==
A number of live performances at the venue have included:

- Tiësto
- Steve Angello
- Sebastian Ingrosso
- Alesso
- Chris Brown
- Benny Benassi
- Example
- Eric Prydz
- Hardwell
- Gorgon City
- Redfoo
- apl.de.ap
- Bingo Players
- Danny Howard
- Far East Movement
- Pete Tong
- Adamski
- Divine
- Duran Duran
- Carl Cox
- 808 State
- Freddie Mercury
- Gloria Gaynor
- Grace Jones
- James Brown
- Kylie Minogue
- José Feliciano
- Kid Creole & The Coconuts
- Orchestral Manoeuvres in the Dark (OMD)
- Spandau Ballet
- Sylvester

== Promoters ==
Notable promoters have included:

- Brasilio de Oliviera
- Gorri
- Faruk Gandji
- Mike, Claire and Andy Manumission

== Celebrity patrons ==
The club has attracted many celebrities over the years, including Boy George, Madonna, David Bowie, Grace Jones, Jean Paul Gaultier, Joni Mitchell, Led Zeppelin, Moschino, Tina Turner, and Valentino.

== In popular culture ==
- The club is seen in the online racing game Test Drive Unlimited 2.
- The club is mentioned in the film Kevin & Perry Go Large.

== Events staged at Privilege ==
Include:

- Resistance (2017)
- Afterlife (2017)
- Babylonia
- Brazil
- Calcutta
- Fort Ku
- La Vaca Asesina (1978-2006)
- Manumission (1994-2007)
- Tanga Night
- The Home of Troy
- The Killing Cow
- The Temple of Love
- White Fool Moon

== See also ==
- List of electronic dance music venues
- Superclub
- Amnesia (nightclub)
- Space (Ibiza nightclub)
