= Amnesia (nightclub) =

Nightclub in Ibiza

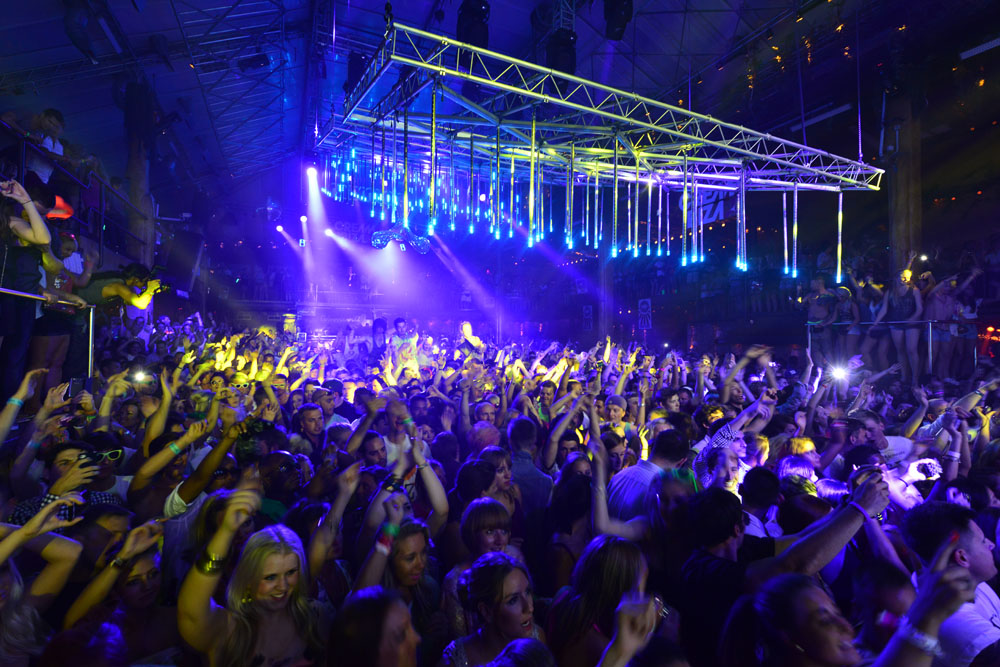
- Crowd on the Amnesia Terrace in 2012
- Interactive map of Amnesia
- Location: San Rafael, Ibiza
- Coordinates: 38°56′52″N 1°24′29″E
- Capacity: 5,000
- Type: nightclub

Construction
- Opened: 1976

Website
- amnesia.es

Amnesia is a nightclub on the Spanish island of Ibiza. It opened in 1976 and won the title of Best Global Club in 2007, 2008, 2009 and 2011 at the IDMA Awards in Miami. The club is located close to the village of San Rafael on the highway between Sant Antoni de Portmany and Ibiza Town.

== History ==
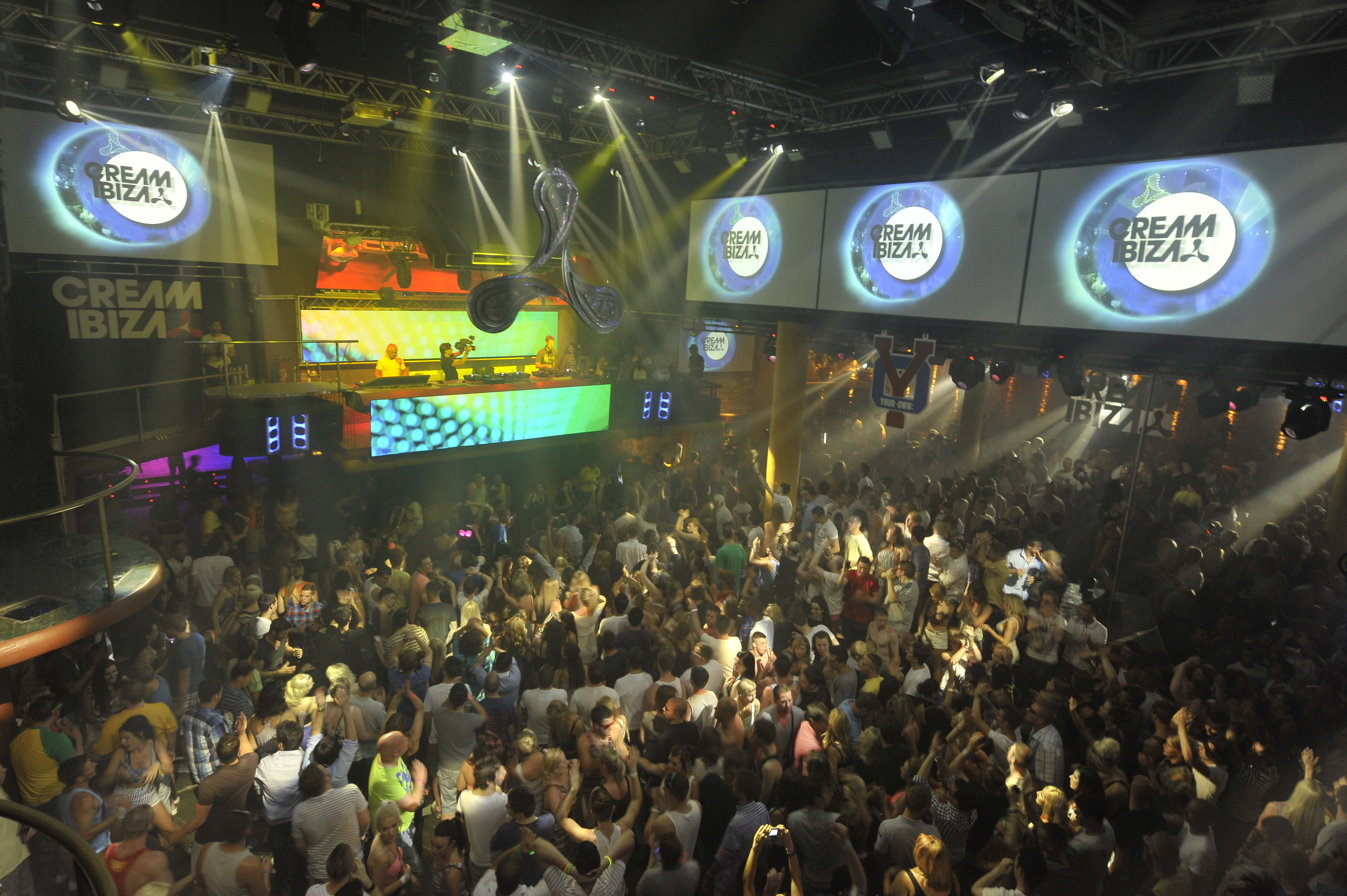
The so-called Main Room of Amnesia in 2012

The finca (country house) that would become the Amnesia nightclub was sold in April 1970 by the Planells family, who had inhabited the house for five generations, to a widow from an aristocratic background. In May 1976, the widow signed a five-year lease on the house to Antonio Escohotado, a Madrid-born philosopher who had arrived on the island five years earlier to start a new life.

Ibiza, which had become a destination for tourism in the 1950s, was in the 1970s a hive of counterculture and idealists. Escohotado sought to turn the old farmhouse into a place for hippie bands and culture. He launched a discotheque named El taller del olvido ("The Workshop of Forgetfulness"). He wanted to express that when people go out at night it is to forget their problems and indulge in an unknown world far away from ordinary routine. However, co-founder Manolo Sáenz de Heredia proposed the Greek word Amnesia. Initially, admission was cheap, 25 pesetas (equivalent to 1.74 EUR now) including one soda or beer. There were no access restrictions. Escohotado was not interested in the commercial operation and left after 8 months. The dance floor was in the open air and sessions lasted until 12 or 1 pm.

In 1978, Ginés Sánchez, a manufacturer from Madrid, took over Amnesia. Unexpected closings alternated with summers with capacity crowds in competition with the other discothèques, such as Ku (now Unvrs Ibiza), Pacha, Glory's, and Lola's.

In the 1980s, Prontxio Izaguirre took over Amnesia, changing its theme to dance music, a mix between pop and funk, and hip hop. Freestyle mixing was permitted, house was about to take over, and Balearic beat was invented by DJs such as Alfredo Fiorito. In 1984, the drug of choice at Amnesia was mescaline from Valencia. In the late 1980s, the routine circuit was:

1. Until 3 am, the bars at the port.
2. Until 5 am, Pachá.
3. Until 6 am, Ku.
4. Amnesia.

On 22 June 1991, Amnesia reopened under MFC management. The clubs of Ibiza began to gain international fame. In the mid-1990s, Ezna Sands brought UK promoters and labels, including Joseph Mullen, onto the Balearic Island and into Amnesia. The island, once merely a destination for holidaymakers aged 18 to 30, became a mecca for dance music enthusiasts. While earlier, each club had a personality, now the parties depended on the theme or the hired DJ. In July 1995, techno parties were brought from Germany.

The club expanded, increasing its bars from four to 16, and growing from a staff of 30 to a summer workforce of more than 200, including waiters, go-go dancers, security, and administration staff. As of 2003, the venue had a capacity of 5,000 people and is divided into two areas: Main Room and Terrace.

Since 2005, Amnesia has been run by the Liverpool nightclub Cream, created and founded by Joseph Mullen in 1995. Mullen sold the brand to Cream UK for £4.8 million and retired from the music industry.

In the 2010s, the government of the Balearic Islands promoted luxury tourism.

The club hosts Cocoon, a party by Sven Väth. The club has also hosted popular nights such as La Troya Asesina.

Over the years, the club hosted DJs and live performers such as Calvin Harris, Swedish House Mafia, Debbie McGee, Alesso, Marshmello, Dimitri Vegas & Like Mike, Steve Aoki, Eric Prydz, Sigala, Sigma, Jonas Blue, Sonny Fodera, Gorgon City, Faithless, Chase & Status, Pete Tong, Fatboy Slim, Duke Dumont, Danny Howard, Philip George, Regard and DJ Fresh.

== Awards and nominations ==
=== DJ Magazine's top 100 clubs ===
Year	Position	Notes	Ref.
2006	?	New entry	
2007	8	—N/a	
2008	3	—N/a	
2009	5	—N/a	
2010	3	—N/a	
2011	4	—N/a	
2012	9	—N/a	
2013	10	—N/a	
2014	6	—N/a	
2015	5	—N/a	
2016	3	—N/a	
2017	11	—N/a	
2018	12	—N/a	
2019	14	—N/a	
2020	12	—N/a	
2021	15	—N/a	
2022	7	—N/a	
2023	7	—N/a	
2024	8	—N/a	

=== International Dance Music Awards ===
Year	Category	Work	Outcome	Ref.
2005 (Note: Category Debut)	Best Global Club	Amnesia - Ibiza Spain	Nominated	
2006	Best Global Club	Amnesia - Ibiza Spain	Nominated	
2007	Best Global Club	Amnesia - Ibiza Spain	Won	
2008	Best Global Club	Amnesia - Ibiza Spain	Won	
2009	Best Global Club	Amnesia - Ibiza Spain	Won	
2010	Best Global Club	Amnesia - Ibiza Spain	Nominated	
2011	Best Global Club	Amnesia - Ibiza Spain	Won	
2012	Best Global Club	Amnesia - Ibiza Spain	Nominated	
2013	Best Global Club	Amnesia - Ibiza Spain	Nominated	
2014	Best Global Club	Amnesia - Ibiza Spain	Nominated	
2015	Best Global Club	Amnesia - Ibiza Spain	Nominated	
2016	Best Global Club	Amnesia - Ibiza Spain	Nominated	

=== International Nightlife Association's Top 100 Clubs ===
Year	Position	Notes	Ref.
2015 (Note: 2005 saw the debut of the chart.)	5	New Entry	
2016	10	—N/a	
2017	8	—N/a	
2019	8	—N/a	

== See also ==
- List of electronic dance music venues
- Privilege Ibiza
