= 1950s nostalgia =

Sentimentality for the 1950s

1950s nostalgia is nostalgia for certain aspects of the 1950s. 1950s nostalgia is a form of decade nostalgia. 1950s retro is retro related to the 1950s.

== Media ==
There has been nostalgia for the 1950s music of Ray Charles. A Pale View of Hills (2025) is partly set in the 1950s. Return to the Forbidden Planet (1983) is based on Forbidden Planet (1956).

== Food ==
There have been 1950s retro diners.

== Australia ==
The Delinquents (1989) is a retro film about the 1950s.

== Canada ==
There has been 1950s nostalgia theatre and film. The Toronto Rock and Roll Revival was a 1950s nostalgia concert.

== Germany ==
1950s retro fashion was produced in 1980s West Germany.

== Hong Kong ==
There are nostalgia films about the 1950s such as He Ain't Heavy, He's My Father (1993).

== Japan ==
In Japan, 1950s nostalgia is part of the broader phenomenon of "Shōwa nostalgia" and "Shōwa retro". 1950s nostalgia overlaps with the "Shōwa 30s boom" of nostalgia for aspects of the Shōwa 30s (1955 to 1964). There are 1950s retro shōtengai (shopping streets). Showa no Machi is a retro town covering the 1950s. Kiki's Delivery Service (1989) is a retro film set in an alternate version of the 1950s. Always: Sunset on Third Street (2005) is a nostalgia film about the 1950s. Other nostalgia films include My Neighbor Totoro (1988), the 2006 film adaptation of Saga No Gabai-baachan, Always: Sunset on Third Street 2 (2007) and Mai Mai Miracle (2009). There are 1950s nostalgia television programmes such as The Waste Land (2009) and Kanryo-tachi No Natsu (2009). The Return of Godzilla (1984) is a sequel to the 1954 film Godzilla. The natsumero boom included the revival of 1950s music. 1950s retro bands have included the Carol and the Black Cats. There is a Frank Nagai song concours. Retro toys have included Tetsujin 28-go dolls. 1950s nostalgia clubs have included Kento's. There has been nostalgia for rotary telephones, kamado-gami masks, rockabilly and 1950s fashion. Retro vehicles have included the 1996 version of the Daihatsu Midget.

== New Zealand ==
There has been 1950s nostalgia chocolate.

== United Kingdom ==
That'll Be the Day (1973) is a nostalgia film about the 1950s. Absolute Beginners (1986) is a retro film about the 1950s. Other films include the documentary Blue Suede Shoes (1980). Nostalgia television programmes about the 1950s include Hi-de-Hi! (1980), The Darling Buds of May (1991), Head over Heels (1993), Lipstick on Your Collar (1993), Born and Bred (2002) and Call the Midwife (2012).

There have been 1950s nostalgia concerts. The London Rock and Roll Show (1973) is a 1950s nostalgia concert film. Three different cover versions of the 1955 song "Unchained Melody" respectively reached number 1 on the UK singles chart in 1990, 1995 and 2002. In 1999, the Cartoons 1998 cover version of the 1958 song "Witch Doctor" reached number 2 on that chart. In 2005, Elvis Presley's "One Night" (1958) reached number 1 on that chart. 1950s retro bands have included Darts and Showaddywaddy.

Revivals have included Teddy Boys and Dan Dare. There have been 1950s nostalgia cinema shows, theatre shows, television scheduling and events. There has been nostalgia for 1950s hobbies.

== United States ==
There has been nostalgia for James Dean; carhops; charm bracelets; and for 1950s television programmes such as Leave It to Beaver, I Love Lucy and Father Knows Best. 1950s fashions have been revived such as the poodle skirt. In 2013, people wanted to time travel to the 1950s more than any other decade.

There have been 1950s nostalgia concerts such as 1950's Rock & Roll Revival. 1950s nostalgia concerts have included musicians such as Little Richard, The Platters and Chuck Berry. Let the Good Times Roll (1973) is a 1950s nostalgia concert film. Grease (1971) is a nostalgia musical about the 1950s. Grease (1978) is a 1950s nostalgia musical film. The song "Bad to the Bone" (1982) is based on "Mannish Boy" (1955). 1950s retro bands have included Sha Na Na.

Nostalgia television programmes about the 1950s include Happy Days (1974) and Laverne & Shirley (1976). M*A*S*H (1972) is a retro television programme set in the 1950s. Quantum Leap (1989) is a retro television programme covering the 1950s. There were roughly thirty 1970s films about the 1950s. Nostalgia films about the 1950s include The Last Picture Show (1971), The Lords of Flatbush (1974), Return to Macon County (1975), Next Stop, Greenwich Village (1976), September 30, 1955 (1977), Diner (1982), Back to the Future (1985), Stand by Me (1986), Cry-Baby (1990), The Man in the Moon (1991), The Iron Giant (1999), Indiana Jones and the Kingdom of the Crystal Skull (2008) and Alien Trespass (2009). 1950s biopics include The Buddy Holly Story (1978), La Bamba (1987) and Great Balls of Fire! (1989). Retro films about the 1950s include Badlands (1973), Our Time (1974) and Quiz Show (1994). The film American Graffiti (1973), which is set in 1962, includes a character, John Milner, who has 1950s nostalgia, and also includes 1950s nostalgia music. Harrison Bergeron (1995) includes a parody of 1950s nostalgia.

References to 1950s greasers, and to the films The Wild One and Rebel Without a Cause, appear in later film and television.

There are 1950s retro restaurants such as the 50's Prime Time Café and the Sci-Fi Dine-In Theater Restaurant.

== See also ==
- 1960s nostalgia
- 1970s nostalgia
- 1980s nostalgia
- 1990s nostalgia
