= Sci-Fi Dine-In Theater Restaurant =

Themed restaurant at Disney's Hollywood Studios

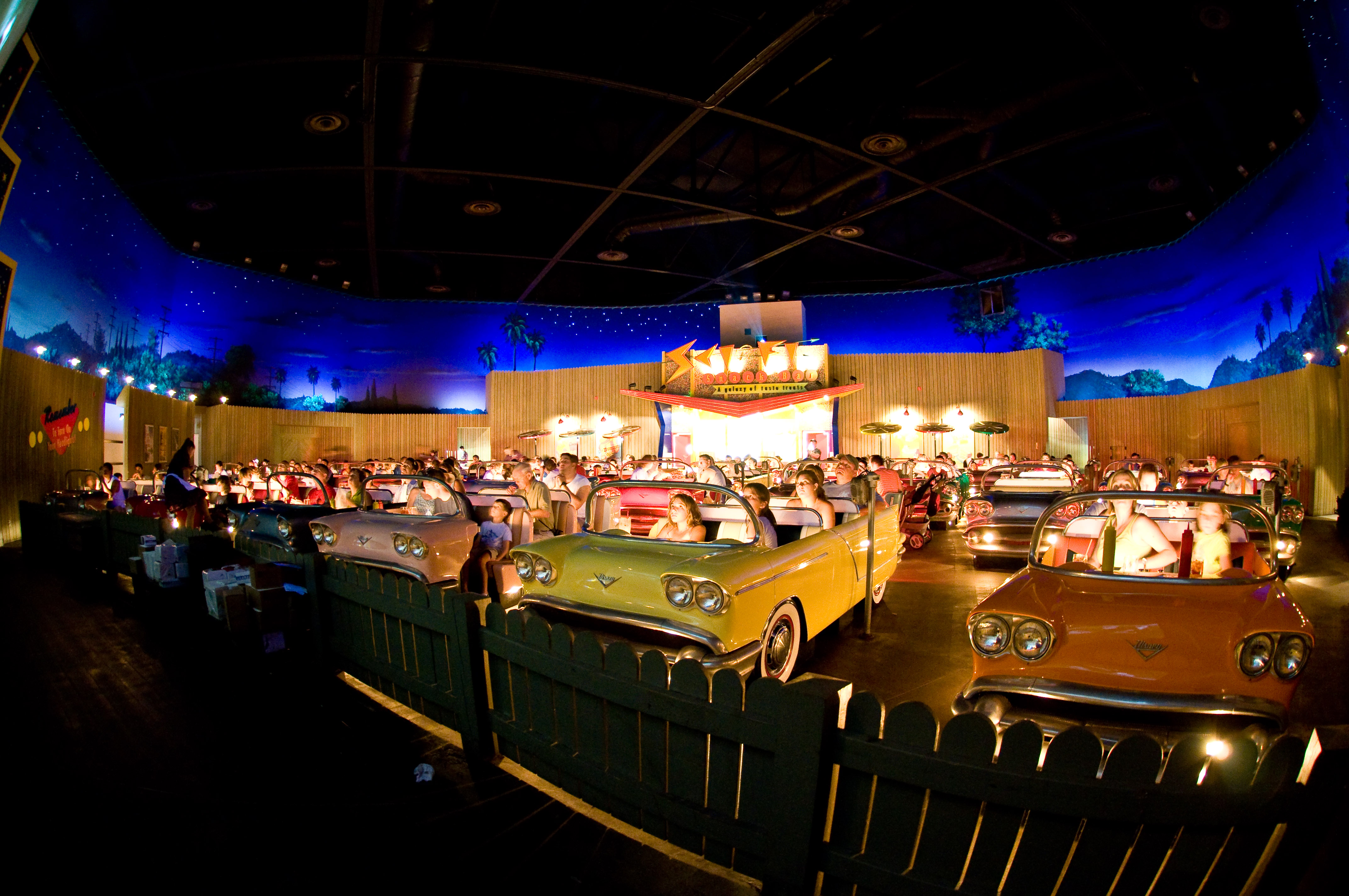
- Sci-Fi Dine-In Theater Restaurant interior
- Interactive map of Sci-Fi Dine-In Theater Restaurant

Restaurant information
- Established: April 20, 1991
- Owner: Disney Experiences
- Food type: Traditional cuisine of the United States
- Dress code: Casual
- Location: Bay Lake, Orange County, Florida, United States
- Coordinates: 28°21′21″N 81°33′35″W
- Seating capacity: 260
- Reservations: Recommended
- Website: Official website

The Sci-Fi Dine-In Theater Restaurant is a theme restaurant at Disney's Hollywood Studios, one of the four main theme parks at Walt Disney World. Established in May 1991, the restaurant is modeled after a 1950s drive-in theater. Walt Disney Imagineering designed the booths to resemble convertibles of the period, and some servers act as carhops while wearing roller skates. While eating, guests watch a large projection screen displaying clips of 1950s and 1960s films such as Frankenstein Meets the Space Monster, Plan 9 from Outer Space, and Attack of the 50 Foot Woman.

The restaurant serves traditional cuisine of the United States. Popcorn functions as a complimentary hors d'oeuvre. Initially, the menu listed items with science fiction themed names, such as "Tossed in Space" (garden salad), "The Cheesecake that Ate New York", and "Attack of the Killer Club Sandwich", but these playful names were later altered so that they now describe the dishes in a more standard and straightforward manner.

In 1991, the Sci-Fi Dine-In opened along with nineteen other new Walt Disney World attractions marking the complex's twentieth anniversary. By the following year, the Sci-Fi Dine-In was serving upwards of 2,200 people daily during peak periods, making it the park's most popular restaurant. Thai movie theater operator EGV Entertainment opened the EGV Drive-in Cafe in Bangkok in 2003, in a very similar style to the Sci-Fi Dine-In.

The Sci-Fi Dine-In has received mixed reviews. USA Today's list of the best restaurants in American amusement parks ranks the Sci-Fi Dine-In fifteenth, but many reviewers rate it more highly for its atmosphere rather than for its cuisine. Ed Bumgardner of the Winston-Salem Journal wrote that the food is more expensive than it is worth, specifically calling the restaurant's roast beef sandwich both delicious and a ripoff. In their book Vegetarian Walt Disney World and Greater Orlando, Susan Shumaker and Than Saffel call the Sci-Fi Dine-In "the wackiest dining experience in any Disney park".

== History ==
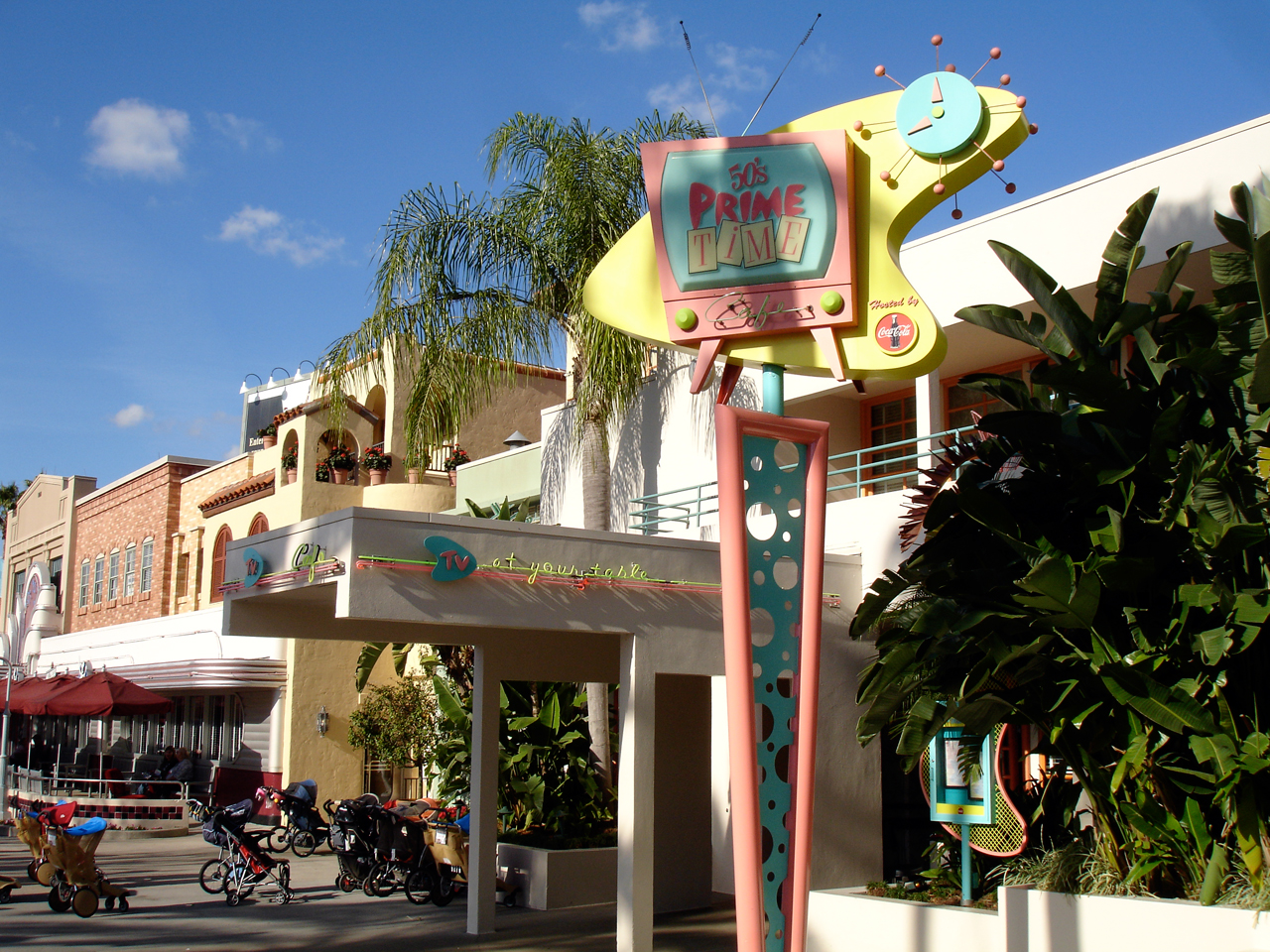
The 50's Prime Time Café, a theme restaurant that opened two years before the Sci-Fi Dine-In. Its success led to an emphasis on theme during the design of the Sci-Fi Dine-In.

As Disney planned new attractions to mark the 20th anniversary of Walt Disney World, it sought to replicate the success of the heavily themed 50's Prime Time Café, opened in 1989 to great success.

The Sci-Fi Dine-In opened on April 20, 1991, on Commissary Lane across from Star Tours and next to the ABC Commissary. Within five weeks, the new restaurant was serving between 1,500 and 2,000 meals a day, comparable to the Prime Time Cafe. A year after opening, the Sci-Fi Dine-In had become the most popular restaurant in the park, serving more than 2,200 people per day at peak periods.

In 2003, there were twenty "character meals" offered at Walt Disney World, during which actors portraying various Disney characters would interact with guests while they ate at the parks' restaurants. At the time, Disney was increasing the presence of costumed characters in the parks. Nonetheless, Minnie Mouse character meals held at Hollywood & Vine were discontinued that year, and Robert Johnson of the Orlando Sentinel partially attributed this cancellation to competition from the Sci-Fi Dine-In, which he said "almost always has a line of customers waiting". (Note: Hollywood & Vine had resumed its Minnie Mouse character meals by 2005.)

== Theme ==
The Sci-Fi Dine-In is modeled after a 1950s drive-in theater. The entrance is made to look like a box office, and guests can walk from there along a tall fence to the dining room, where they sit at formica countertops in booths made to look like convertibles from the 1940s and 1950s. These booths were designed by Walt Disney Imagineering and are made of fiberglass with much chrome plating. The cars have whitewall tires, and speakers are mounted on poles next to each car. The license plates are dated from 1955. Each convertible seats four people, although these mock vehicles were initially six-seaters when the restaurant first opened. There are six picnic tables near the back of the room that are only used when the rest of the restaurant is full and there are guests who are willing to forgo the experience of sitting in the cars. All guests who make reservations are seated in the cars, although this was not the case the year the restaurant first opened. The restaurant has a total seating capacity of 260.

The restaurant's servers use point of sale mobile devices to relay orders to a printer in the kitchen, which in 1991 was a then-new technology in keeping with the science fiction theme.

Some of the servers at the Sci-Fi Dine-In wear roller skates, acting as carhops, while others improvise characters such as a police officer ostensibly in search of people who have sneaked into the theater without paying. The dining room is dark and air-conditioned, and measures 8,400 square feet (780 m^{2}). The ceiling simulates a night sky replete with twinkling stars made from optical fibers. There is the facade of a snack counter at the back of the room, behind which is the kitchen. The upper walls of the dining room display a cyclorama of Southern California as seen over a fence.

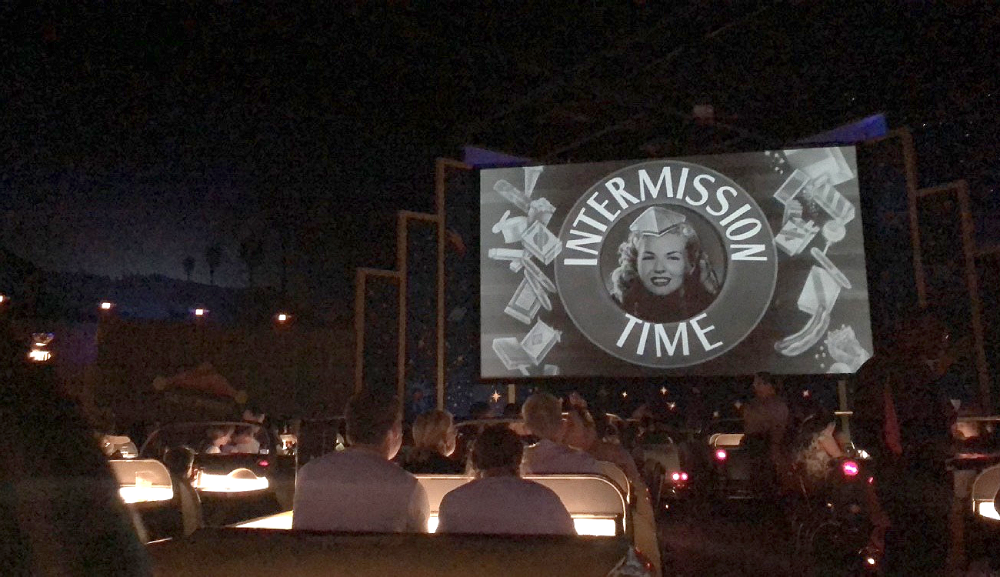
Patrons inside the car-themed booths watching the screen

While eating at the Sci-Fi Dine-In, guests watch film clips from 1950s and 1960s science fiction films, B horror films, monster movies, pseudo-documentaries, bizarre newsreels, and animated cartoons, all on a loop that lasts 47 minutes. The film clips are taken from such films as The Blob, Frankenstein Meets the Space Monster, Teenagers from Outer Space, The Amazing Colossal Man, Plan 9 from Outer Space, Invasion of the Saucer Men, and Cat-Women of the Moon. The original Attack of the 50 Foot Woman trailer is also included. The clips are shown on a large projection screen. During Star Wars Weekends, a special breakfast is offered called the Star Wars Dine-In Galactic Breakfast, during which guests can interact with Star Wars characters and watch clips from the Star Wars films. Film props and vintage horror and science fiction movie posters can be found on the outside perimeter of the themed restaurant, including many props used in Disney's The Rocketeer, which premiered about three months after the restaurant opened.

== Food ==
At the Sci-Fi Dine-In, lunch guests stay for an average of fifty minutes and dinner guests for an average of just longer than an hour, with lunch and dinner guests being served their food on average five and ten minutes after ordering respectively. The restaurant participates in the Disney Dining Plan. Meals are served starting at 10:30 a.m. on Sundays and Wednesdays, and starting at 11:00 a.m. every other day of the week. The restaurant closes each day at the same time that the park does, which is in the late evening. The menu is the same all day, without a distinction between lunch and dinner. A full bar service is available, and there is also a limited wine selection.

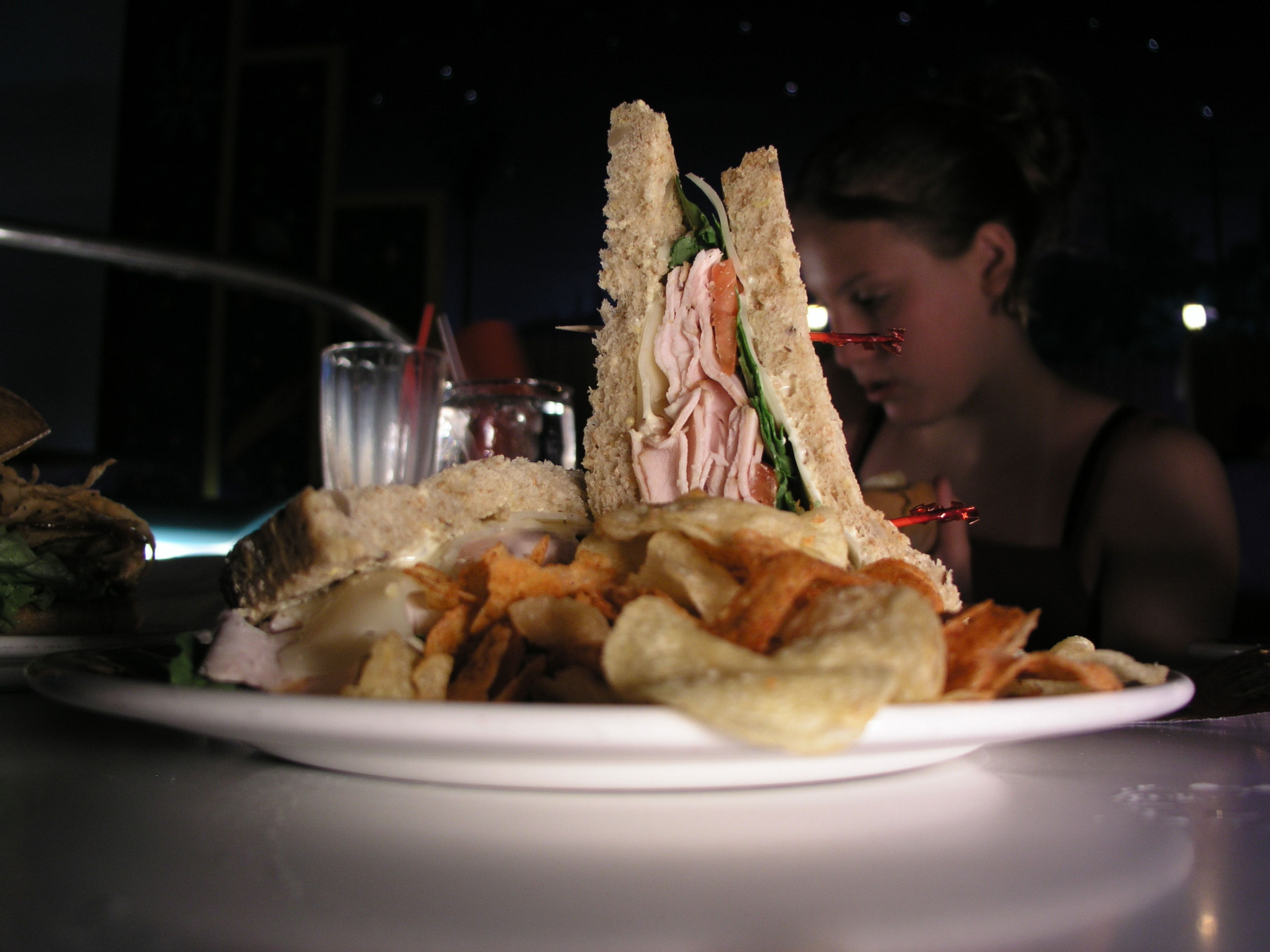
Items in the restaurant's menu used to have themed names, such as "Attack of the Killer Club Sandwich", but these have since been replaced with more recognizable names.

Food selection at the restaurant comes from the traditional cuisine of the United States. Popcorn used to be served as a free hors d'oeuvre. Other food items include milkshakes, hot fudge sundaes, seafood salad, turkey sloppy joes, fried pickles, St. Louis-style barbecue ribs, beef-and-blue-cheese salads, sautéed shrimp with farfalle, French fries, cucumber salads, Buffalo wings, Boca Burgers, Tofutti, and steaks. Drinks include souvenir phosphorescent ice cubes. The desserts are served in larger portions than are customary elsewhere. There are vegetarian options. The chefs at the Sci-Fi Dine-In sometimes cater for special requests in advance. The cookbook Delicious Disney Just for Kids contains a recipe for the BLT soup served at the Sci-Fi Dine-In.

Items in the restaurant's menu used to have themed names, such as "The Galactic Grill" (triple-decker grilled cheese sandwich), "Beast from 1,000 Islands" (Reuben sandwich), "Tossed in Space" (garden salad), "The Cheesecake that Ate New York", "Attack of the Killer Club Sandwich", "Beach Party Panic" (fish fillet), "Saucer Sightings" (rib eye steak), "Terror of the Tides" (broiled fish), and "Journey to the Center of the Pasta" (vegetable lasagne), but these have since been replaced with more descriptive names. A popcorn bisque was once on the menu, but it was removed due to poor reception.

== Imitation ==
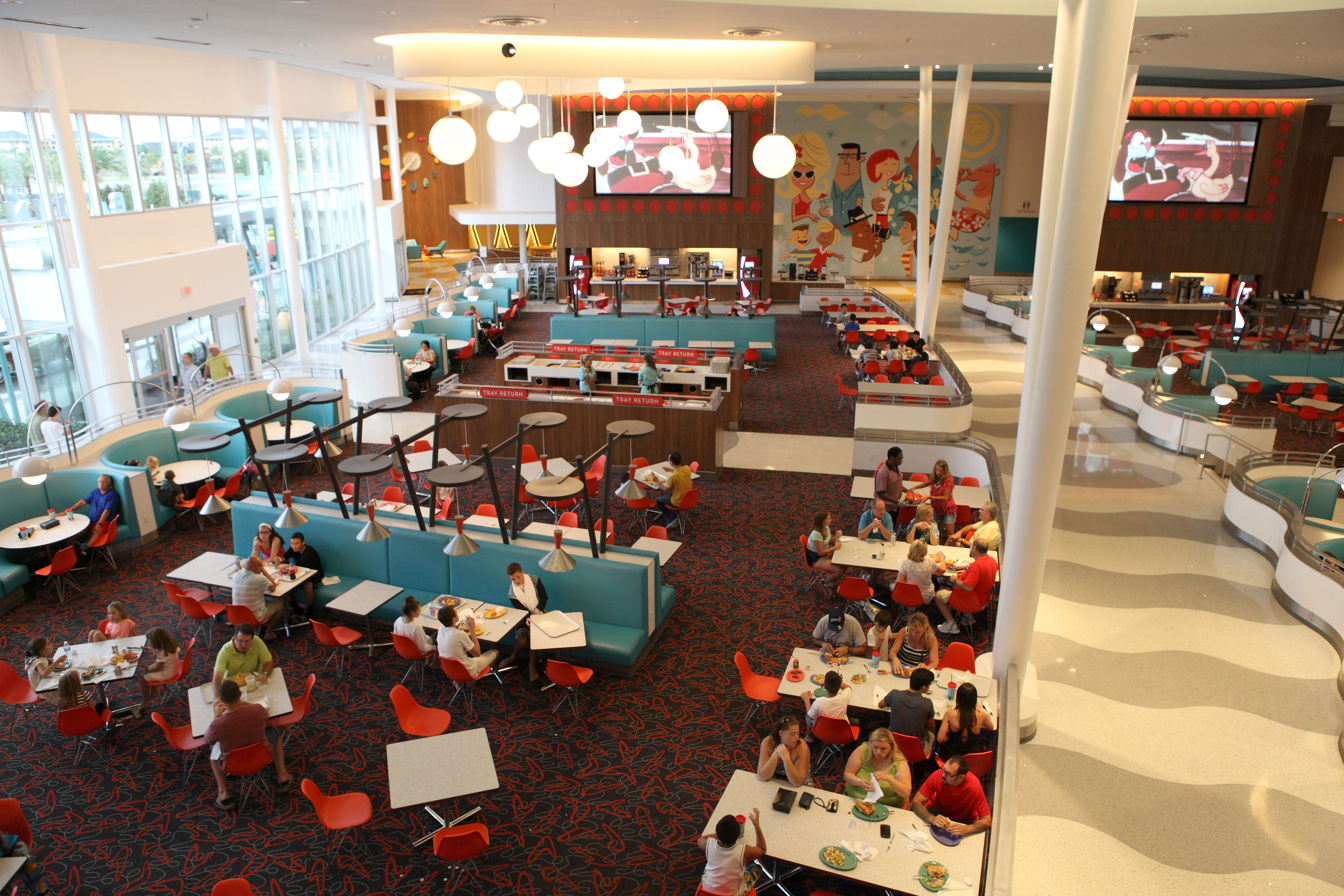
Disney's Sci-Fi Dine-In has inspired two other companies to found similar restaurants: the EGV Drive-in Cafe in Thailand, and Universal Orlando's Bayliner Diner (pictured).

In 2003, EGV Entertainment, a movie theater operator in Thailand, opened the EGV Drive-in Cafe in Bangkok, explicitly modeling the restaurant after the Sci-Fi Dine-In. Wichai Poolwaraluk, the company's executive president and chief executive officer, visited the Sci-Fi Dine-In in 2000, and was inspired to open a similar restaurant. He said that, while he was eating at the Sci-Fi Dine-In, the other guests seemed more interested in their food than in the film clips on the screen, and he therefore considered the Sci-Fi Dine-In more of a restaurant than a theater, with the film reel simply being a gimmick. Appealing to EGV's identity as a movie theater operator, Poolwaraluk said that the EGV Drive-in Cafe "can probably do a better job blending the cinema and the food together and also concentrate on both of them". Like the Sci-Fi Dine-In, the EGV Drive-in Cafe features classic cars for seating, but, instead of showing film clips on a loop, the EGV Drive-in Cafe shows entire short films.

In 2014, NBCUniversal opened Universal Orlando's first prime-value hotel, Universal's Cabana Bay Beach Resort, which houses the Bayliner Diner, a restaurant that borrows its premise from the Sci-Fi Dine-In. Both restaurants play old film footage on a loop.

== Reception ==
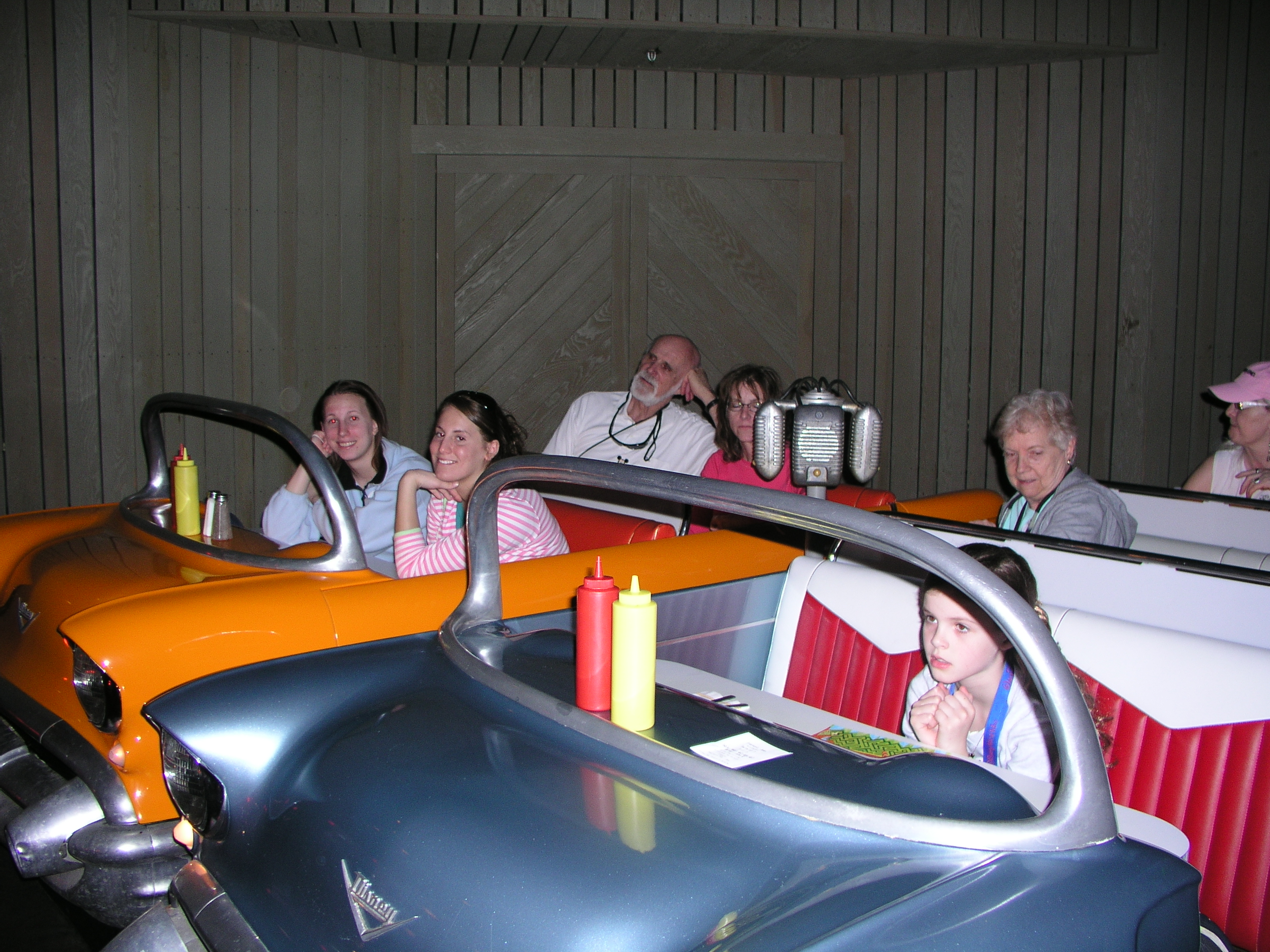
Multiple reviewers have called the Sci-Fi Dine-In more notable for being an attraction than a food destination.

The Sci-Fi Dine-In has received mixed reviews. Jack Hayes of Nation's Restaurant News calls the Sci-Fi Dine-In "wacky" and "on the cutting edge of sheer dining fun". In USA Today's list of the sixteen best restaurants in American amusement parks, the Sci-Fi Dine-In ranks fifteenth. Samuel Muston of The Independent writes that the Sci-Fi Dine-In is "memorable in the best way". In the Evansville Courier & Press, Pete DiPrimio writes that the Sci-Fi Dine-In ranks among the most unusual of the restaurants at Disney's Hollywood Studios. In The Unofficial Guide to Walt Disney World 2015, Bob Sehlinger and Len Testa call the Sci-Fi Dine-In the most entertaining restaurant in Walt Disney World, writing that "everyone gets a kick out of this unusual dining room".

Multiple reviewers have called the Sci-Fi Dine-In more notable for being an attraction than a food destination. One reviewer from The Guardian compares the Sci-Fi Dine-In to Epcot's Coral Reef Restaurant, writing that both restaurants "are great settings" where "eating is awful". Sehlinger and Testa consider the prices too high, and the food too simple, although they praise the Reuben sandwich and the ribs. Schultz writes that the food is simple and that some of the beers are decent. The book DK Eyewitness Travel Guide: Walt Disney World Resort & Orlando also states that the food is more expensive than it is worth. Ed Bumgardner of the Winston-Salem Journal shared this opinion, specifically singling out the restaurant's roast beef sandwich as a ripoff, despite calling it delicious. Peggy Katalinich of the Tampa Bay Times and author Corey Sandler both write that that, although the food is mediocre, the food quality is not the main focus for guests. Katalinich also states that the prices are low, particularly for sandwiches. In Frommer's Walt Disney World and Orlando 2012, Laura Lea Miller calls the food mediocre, expressing disappointment that the menu no longer contains playful item names, but writes positively of the atmosphere.

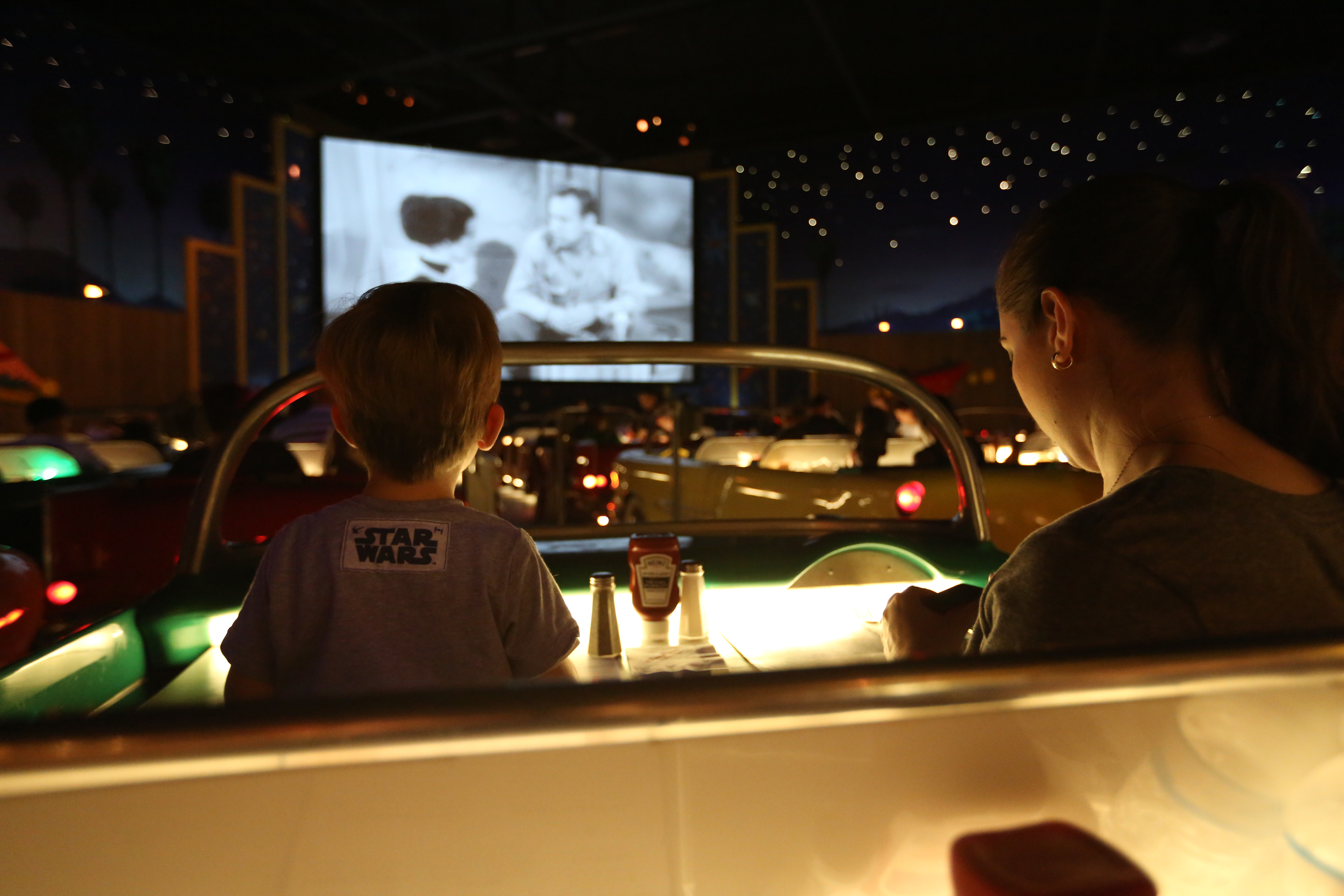
Reviewers Susan Shumaker and Than Saffel write that the Sci-Fi Dine-In is particularly suitable for families with young children.

Some food items at the Sci-Fi Dine-In have been received favorably by reviewers. Rona Gindin and Jennifer Greenhill-Taylor write highly of the restaurant's hot-fudge sundaes in Fodor's 2012 Walt Disney World. Douglas Ingersoll writes positively of the milkshakes in Plan Your Walt Disney World Vacation in No Time, as does a reviewer for the United Kingdom's The Sentinel. Ingersoll also writes that the sandwiches and burgers are better than at the fast food restaurants in the park.

Positive reviews of the Sci-Fi Dine-In have indicated diverse reasons for appreciating the restaurant. In Vegetarian Walt Disney World and Greater Orlando, Susan Shumaker and Than Saffel write that the restaurant has "the wackiest dining experience in any Disney park". Shumaker and Saffel contend that the Sci-Fi Dine-In provides a reasonable compromise when vegetarians and non-vegetarians are looking to eat together, and that it is also suitable for both large and small families with young children. The restaurant tends to be popular with children, and it is common for people who lived through the 1950s to enjoy the restaurant for its nostalgia value. Paul Schultz of the Daily News writes, "Anyone who is a fan of trashy sci-fi movies of the 1950s should check [the Sci-Fi Dine-In] out". In his book Sci-Fi Movie Freak, Robert Ring calls the Sci-Fi Dine-In film clips "hokey", while David Steele of The Rotarian calls them "classically awful", and Rick Ramseyer of Restaurant Business Magazine calls them "campy".

== See also ==
- Googie architecture
- Retro style

== Bibliography ==
- Gindin, Rona; Greenhill-Taylor, Jennifer (2012). Fodor's 2012 Walt Disney World. Fodor's Travel Publications. ISBN 978-0679009481.
- Ingersoll, Douglas S. (2005). Plan Your Walt Disney World Vacation in No Time. Pearson Education. ISBN 0789734028.
- Miller, Laura Lea (2011). Frommer's Walt Disney World and Orlando 2012 (13 ed.). John Wiley & Sons. ISBN 978-1118168042.
- Ring, Robert C. (2011). Sci-Fi Movie Freak. Krause Publications. ISBN 978-1440228636.
- Sandler, Corey (2007). Walt Disney World Resort: Also Includes Seaworld and Central Florida (5 ed.). Globe Pequot Press. ISBN 978-0762741694.
- Sehlinger, Bob; Testa, Len (2014). The Unofficial Guide to Walt Disney World 2015. Unofficial Guides. ISBN 978-1628090208.
- Shumaker, Susan; Saffel, Than (2003). Vegetarian Walt Disney World and Greater Orlando: The Essential Guide for the Health-Conscious Traveler. Globe Pequot Press. ISBN 0762727039.
- Steinberg, Phyllis; Steinberg, Arvin; Hayes, Joseph; Martin, Charles (2012). DK Eyewitness Travel Guide: Walt Disney World Resort & Orlando. Dorling Kindersley. ISBN 978-0756693459.
- Wiley, Kim Wright (2005). Fodor's Walt Disney World with Kids 2006. Fodor's. ISBN 140001574X.
