= Hollywood and Vine (disambiguation) =

Hollywood and Vine is the intersection of Hollywood Boulevard and Vine Street in Hollywood.

Hollywood and Vine may also refer to:

- Hollywood & Vine (restaurant), a restaurant in Disney's Hollywood Studios
- Hollywood and Vine (film), a 1945 comedy film
- Hollywood/Vine (Los Angeles Metro station), a Metro station in Hollywood, Los Angeles, California
