= 1970s nostalgia =

Sentimentality for the 1970s

1970s nostalgia is nostalgia for certain aspects of the 1970s. 1970s nostalgia is a form of decade nostalgia. 1970s retro is retro related to the 1970s.

== Media ==
67% of baby boomers, born between 1958 and 1963, had nostalgia for media from the 1970s in twelve markets in 2023.

=== Music ===
1970s music was the third most popular decade's music in Europe in 2010. There has been nostalgia for 1970s punk rock, 1970s progressive rock, 1970s glam rock, 1970s disco and 1970s heavy metal. There was nostalgia for 1970s music and musicians in 1986. There has been nostalgia for the 1970s music of Bob Marley and the Wailers, Earth, Wind & Fire and AC/DC. Daddy Cool (2006) is a 1970s nostalgia musical. There are 1970s nostalgia radio stations.

== Fashion ==
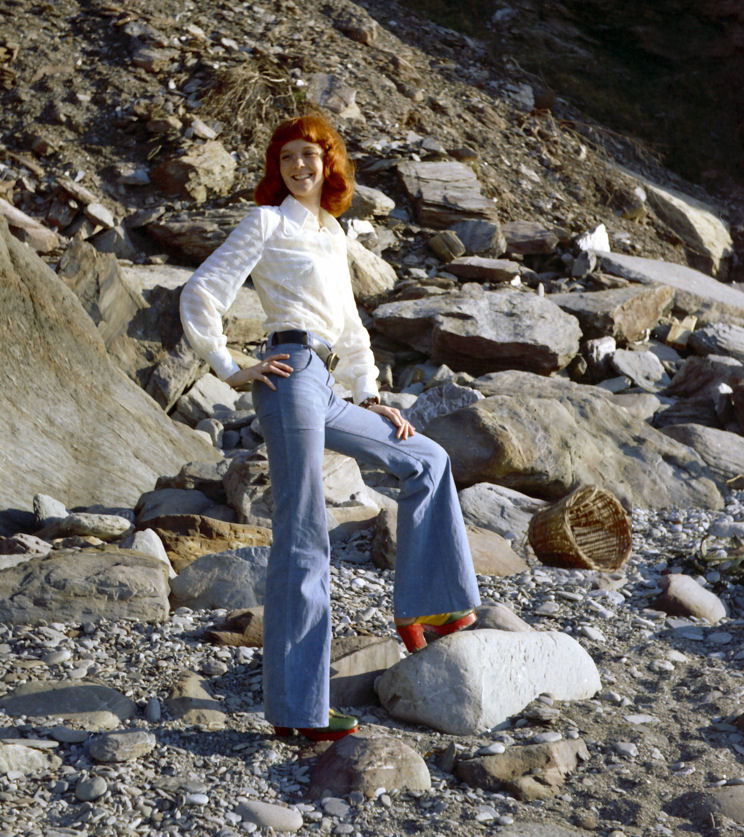
Person wearing 1970s bell-bottoms

1970s retro fashion has been produced by Karl Lagerfeld and others. 1970s jewellery fashions have been revived. There has been nostalgia for bell-bottoms, platform shoes, disco fashion, Farrah Fawcett's hairstyle and other 1970s hairstyles, ABBA's stage clothes, and for the 1970s fashion designs of Thea Porter. There are 1970s nostalgia influencers on social media.

== Sport ==
Rollerskating has been revived.

== Africa ==
=== Botswana ===
There are 1970s nostalgia disco parties.

== Asia ==
=== Japan ===
Expo '70 logo

In Japan, 1970s nostalgia is part of the broader phenomenon of "Shōwa nostalgia" and "Shōwa retro". There is nostalgia for Expo '70; for 1970s vending machines; for 1970s floral pattern tableware; for 1970s jukeboxes; for 1970s television programmes such as Space Battleship Yamato; for 1970s arcade games such as Space Invaders and Lunar Rescue; and for the 1970s music of artists such as Momoe Yamaguchi, Miki Matsubara, Finger 5, Yuming, Saki Kubota, the Southern All Stars, Chieko Matsumoto Sayuri Ishikawa, Kaguyahime, Kaze, Miyuki Nakajima and the Candies. There are 1970s retro tribute bands such as Pink Babies. There are 1970s retro cars, such as the Mitsuoka M55 from Mitsuoka. The films Crayon Shin-chan: The Storm Called: The Adult Empire Strikes Back (2001) and 20th Century Boys (2008) are expressions of 1970s nostalgia.

=== Malaysia ===
There are 1970s retro albums.

=== Philippines ===
There is nostalgia for 1970s music among Generation Y. There is nostalgia for the 1970s music of Sampaguita among the 1970s Generation.

=== Taiwan ===
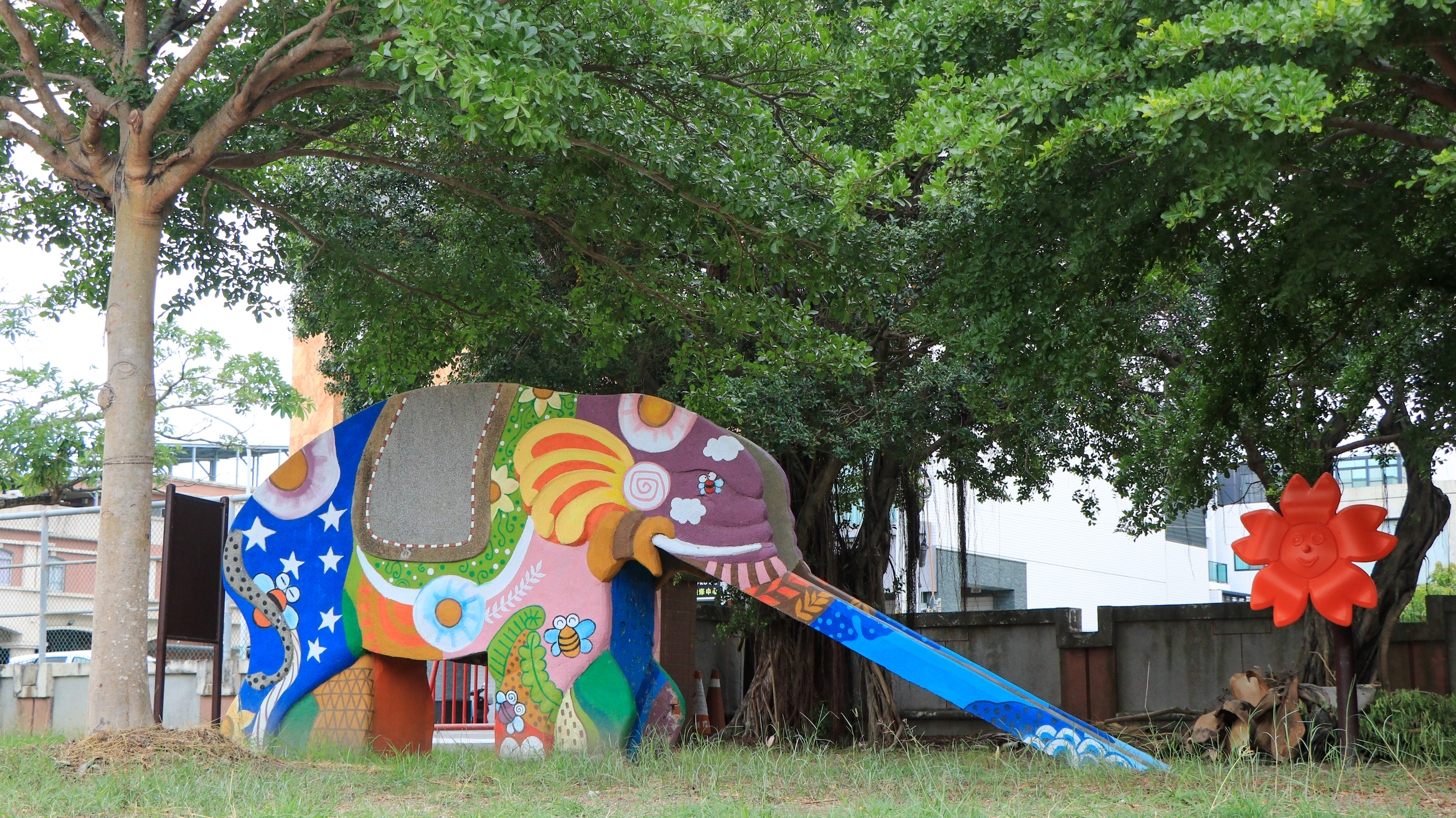
Elephant slide in Taiwan

There is nostalgia for 1970s elephant slides.

== Australasia ==
=== Australia ===
There are 1970s tribute bands such as Björn Again. There have been 1970s nostalgia musicals, such as one by Jonathan Biggins. There has been nostalgia for 1970s television such as The Paul Hogan Show and 1970s technology such as citizens band radios. Kylie Minogue's album Disco (2020) includes 1970s retro music. The Candy Harlots were influenced by 1970s music.

=== New Zealand ===
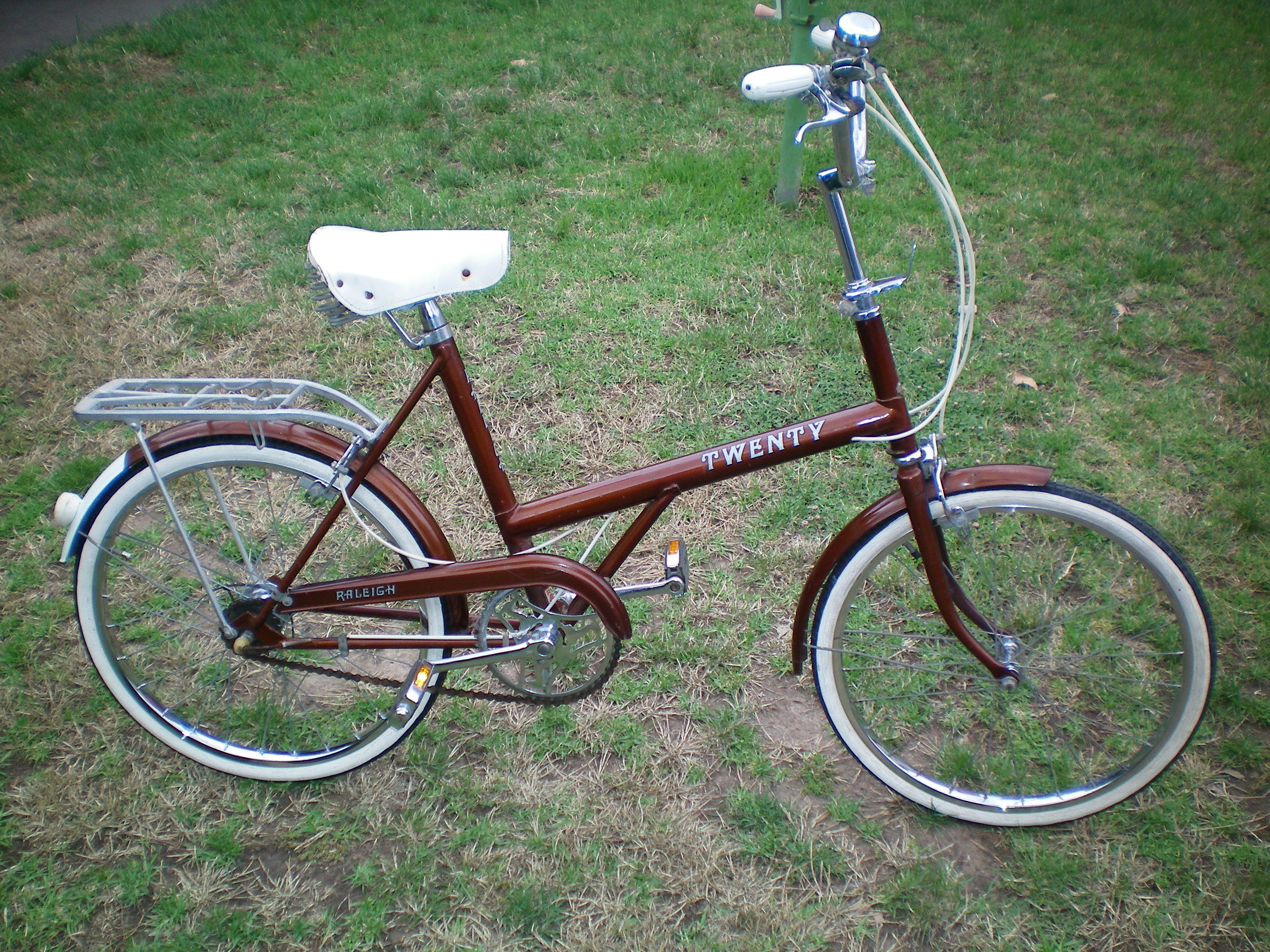
1975 Raleigh Twenty

There has been nostalgia for 1970s canvas shoes and Raleigh Twenty bicycles.

== Europe ==
=== Denmark ===
There has been nostalgia for 1970s children's clothing and nursery decoration.

=== France ===
There are 1970s retro hotels and cars.

=== Spain ===
There are 1970s nostalgia theatre shows and concerts.

=== Sweden ===
There is nostalgia for Rigello.

=== United Kingdom ===
The Smash Martians

There has been nostalgia for the character Morph (from the Morph series) and the Smash Martians; for 1970s television programmes such as Fawlty Towers and The Two Ronnies; for the 1970s music of Fleetwood Mac, Pink Floyd, Elton John, the Rolling Stones, Dire Straits, Led Zeppelin, Queen and Electric Light Orchestra; and for 1970s furniture, 1970s avocado bathrooms, 1970s food and 1970s perfumes. Lava lamps have been revived. As of 2017, Generation Y were nostalgic for the 1970s. In 2019, 32% of people thought that life was better in the 1970s. In 2025, most people thought the country was happier in 1975.

There are 1970s nostalgia theatre shows, exhibitions, restaurants and holiday homes. 1970s comedy was more popular than any other decade's comedy in 2013. There have been 1970s themed nights on television. There are nostalgia television programmes about 1970s food. 1970s retro television programmes include Life on Mars (2006) and The Enfield Haunting (2015). Cradle to Grave (2015) is a nostalgia television programme about the 1970s. Cemetery Junction (2010) is a nostalgia film about the 1970s. High-Rise (2015) is a 1970s nostalgia film. Now 70s is a 1970s nostalgia music television channel. Rewind TV is a nostalgia television channel covering the 1970s. There are retro online video channels with 1970s television programmes such as Sapphire & Steel. I Love the '70s (2000), Sounds of the Seventies (1993), Sounds of the 70s 2 (2012) and Match of the Seventies (1995) are 1970s nostalgia documentaries. Heart 70s, Absolute Radio 70s and Smooth 70s are 1970s nostalgia radio stations.

1970s music was the third most popular decade's music in 2017. Sounds of the 70s is a 1970s nostalgia radio programme. 1970s retro music has been produced by Transvision Vamp. In 1986, Doctor and the Medics reached number 1 with a cover version of Norman Greenbaum's 1970 number 1 single "Spirit in the Sky". This was an expression of nostalgia. The single "Bohemian Rhapsody" (1975) reached number 1 in 1991 due to nostalgia following Freddie Mercury's death.

== North America ==
=== Canada ===
There have been 1970s nostalgia exhibitions.

=== United States ===
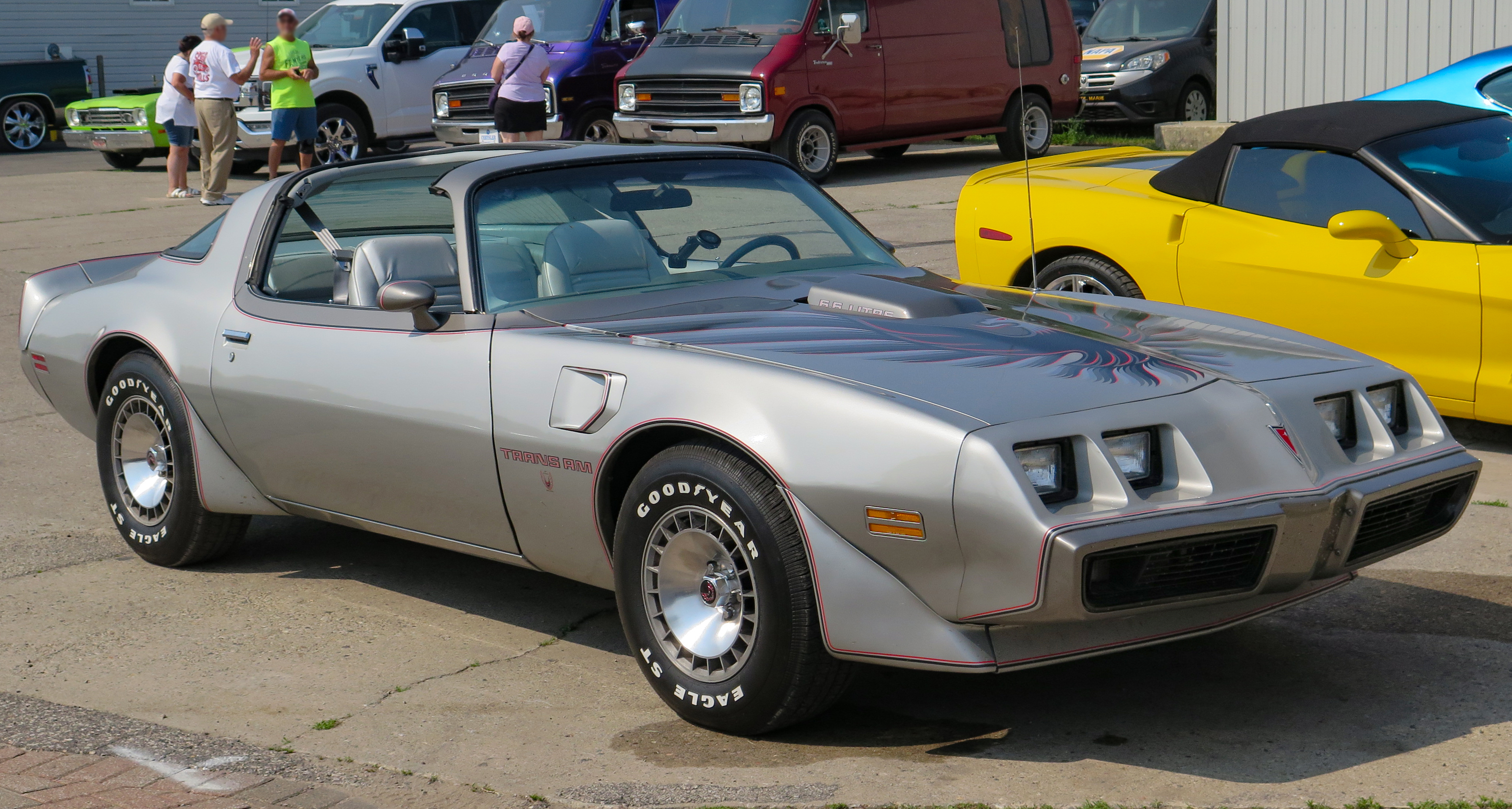
1979 10th Anniversary Pontiac Firebird Trans Am

There has been nostalgia for 1970s cars, 1970s disco balls and 1970s desserts; for The Rockford Files (1974), Space: 1999 (1975), Star Wars (1977) and Battlestar Galactica (1978); and for the New York City of the late 1970s. There have been revivals of Chia Pets and harvest gold. There has been 1970s nostalgia among Generation X. In 2023, most Americans believed that life was better in 1973. In 2013, 12% of Americans wanted to time travel to the 1970s more than any other decade. There have been 1970s nostalgia parties and restaurants.

There are 1970s nostalgia films such as The Brady Bunch Movie (1995). Nostalgia films about the 1970s include The Spirit of '76 (1990), My Girl (1991), Crooklyn (1994), Apollo 13 (1995), Dick (1999), The Virgin Suicides (1999), Man on the Moon (1999), Detroit Rock City (1999), Almost Famous (2000), Anchorman: The Legend of Ron Burgundy (2004), Roll Bounce (2005), CBGB (2013), American Hustle (2013), The Nice Guys (2016), Spinning Gold (2023) and The Holdovers (2023). 1970s retro films include Dazed and Confused (1993) and Austin Powers in Goldmember (2002). Alien: Romulus (2024) is a retrofuturist film that imitates a 1970s film and received a retro VHS release (the first since 2006). Nostalgia television programmes about the 1970s include That '70s Show (1998), F Is for Family (2015), Vinyl (2016), The Get Down (2016), Gaslit (2022), The Offer (2022) and Daisy Jones & the Six (2023). Season 2 of Fargo (2015) and Poker Face (2023) are 1970s retro television programmes. 1970s television, such as Charlie's Angels (1976), has been released on video. There are remakes and reboots of films and television programmes released in the 1970s. I Love the '70s (2003) is a 1970s nostalgia documentary.

Will to Power's 1988 medley of 1970s songs "Baby, I Love Your Way/Freebird Medley" reached number 1 on the Billboard Hot 100. Fleetwood Mac's song "Dreams" (1977) charted in 2020, as a result of a TikTok video, and Steely Dan was also popular. 1970s music has been re-released and covered, and such cover versions have been included in film soundtracks. 1970s music was the second most popular decade's music in 2021. 1970s rock music was then the joint most popular decade's rock music, and 1970s rhythm and blues music was also popular. As of 1994, 1970s music was displacing 1960s music on AC radio stations. The Smashing Pumpkins song "1979" (1996) has a 1970s nostalgia title and music video. Daisy Jones & the Six's Aurora (2023) is a 1970s retro soundtrack album. There are 1970s nostalgia compilation albums such as Have a Nice Decade: The 70s Pop Culture Box (1998). Sounds of the Seventies (1989) is a 1970s nostalgia compilation album series. '70s on 7 is a 1970s nostalgia radio station.

== See also ==
- 1950s nostalgia
- 1960s nostalgia
- 1980s nostalgia
- 1990s nostalgia
