= 1960s nostalgia =

Sentimentality for the 1960s

1960s nostalgia is nostalgia for certain aspects of the 1960s. 1960s nostalgia is a form of decade nostalgia. 1960s retro is retro related to the 1960s.

== Media ==
31% of baby boomers, born between 1958 and 1963, had nostalgia for media from the 1960s in twelve markets in 2023.

=== Music ===
1960s music was the fourth most popular decade's music in Europe in 2010. 1960s retro music genres include neo-psychedelia.

=== Television ===
1960s television programmes have been rebooted.

=== Literature ===
There are novels that include 1960s nostalgia such as The Armageddon Rag (1983).

== Australia ==
There have been 1960s revival bands.

== France ==
There have been 1960s nostalgia exhibitions such as one at Fondation Cartier, and one on nouveau réalisme at Musée d'Art Moderne de Paris, both in 1986. There is 1960s retro fashion. Âge tendre, la tournée des idoles (2006) is a nostalgia concert tour that included 1960s yé-yé music and 1960s singers such as Annie Philippe. Nostalgia radio includes 1960s music.

== Hong Kong ==
There are nostalgia films about the 1960s. 92 Legendary La Rose Noire (1992) is a 1960s retro film.

== Italy ==
There are 1960s nostalgia trains.

== Japan ==
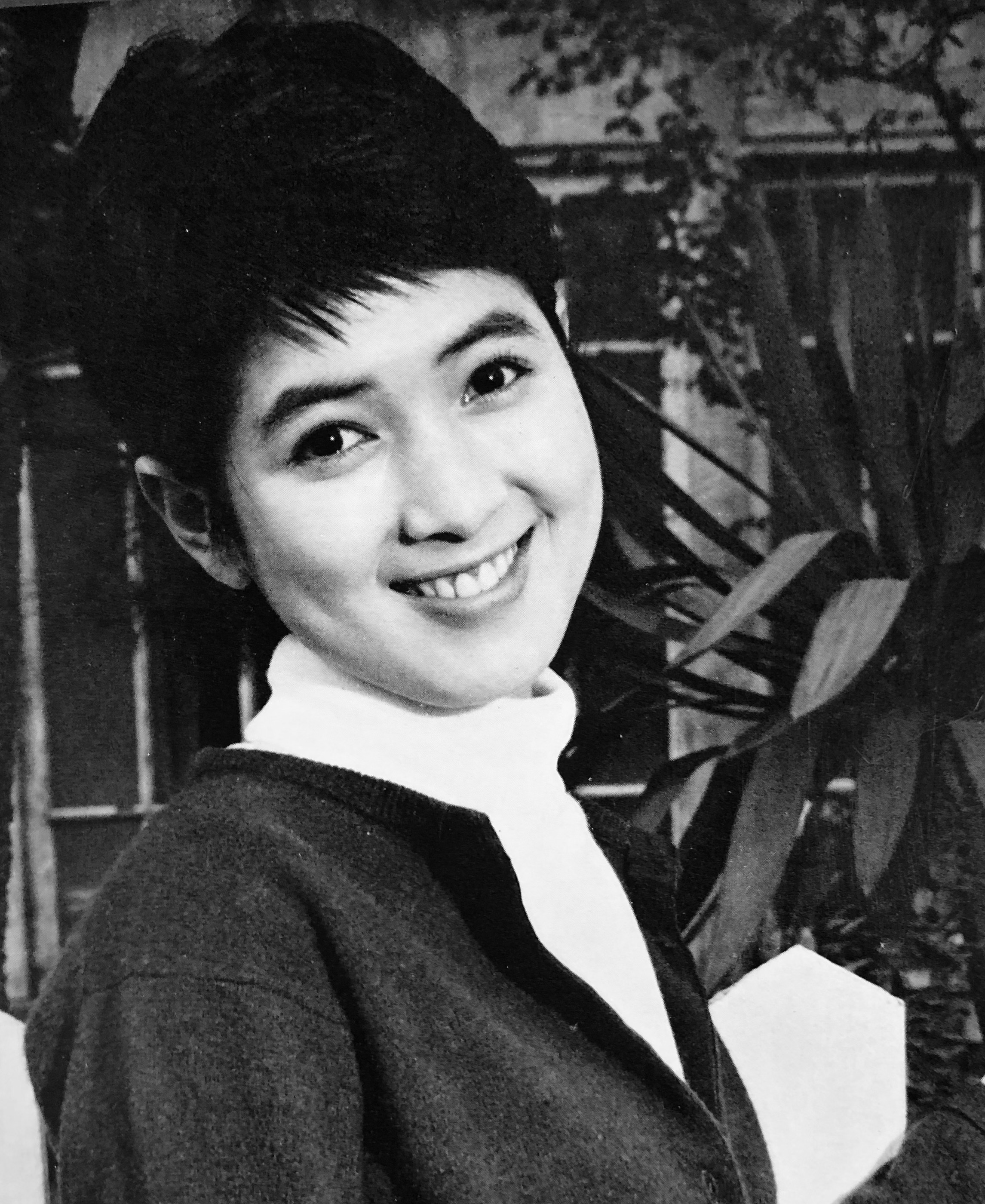
Ayumi Ishida in 1965

In Japan, 1960s nostalgia is part of the broader phenomenon of "Shōwa nostalgia" and "Shōwa retro". 1960s nostalgia overlaps with the "Shōwa 30s boom" of nostalgia for aspects of the Shōwa 30s (1955 to 1964). Nostalgia films about the 1960s include Break Through! (2005), Hula Girls (2006), the 2006 film adaptation of Metoro Ni Notte, Hatsukoi (2006), the 2007 film adaptation of Kiiroi Namida, GS Wonderland (2008), Lost Crime: Flash (2010), From Up on Poppy Hill (2011) and Always: Sunset on Third Street '64 (2012). The film Only Yesterday (1991) has 1960s nostalgia scenes. The Stars and Moon are Holes in the Sky (2025) is a 1960s retro film. There are nostalgia television programmes about the 1960s Oriental Witches volleyball team. 1960s works, such as Ashita no Joe and Star of the Giants, have been reissued. Retro toys have included Ultraman dolls. There is a car that looks like Mach Five.

1960s group sounds music has been revived and 1960s group sounds films have been re-released. There is nostalgia for the 1960s music of Norihiko Hashida & The Shoebelts, The Folk Crusaders, The Tigers, Billy BanBan, Ayumi Ishida and Pinky & Killers. 1960s retro music groups include Mi-Ke and The Captains. "Moonlight Densetsu" (1992) is similar to Chieko Baisho's 1965 song "Sayonara Wa Dansu No Ato Ni". Wink's Overture! (1993) is a 1960s retro album. The Juicy Fruits wore uniforms similar to those of 1960s group sounds bands on the sleeve of their cover version of Sonna Hiroshi Ni Damasarete in 1983. Hitomi Shimatani's 2002 cover version of the Village Singers' 1968 song "Amairo No Kami No Otome" sold more copies than the original. In 1992, there were cover versions of "Coffee Rumba" (1961) by Yōko Oginome and "Furimukanaide" (1962) by Wink.

== Poland ==
There has been nostalgia for 1960s children's books.

== United Kingdom ==
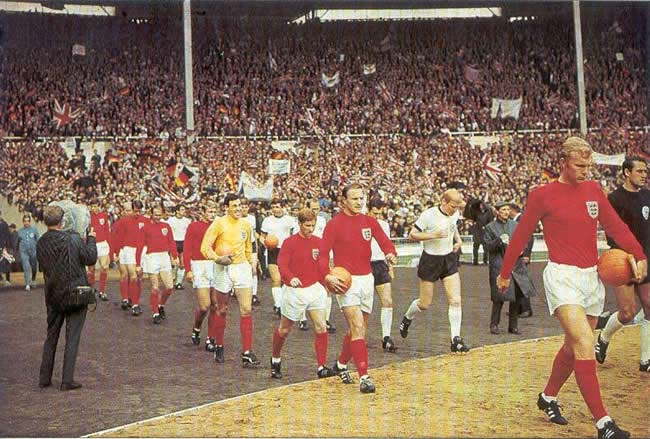
1966 FIFA World Cup final

In 2016, more people thought that the country was best in the 1960s than any other decade. In 2019, 31% of people thought that life was better in the 1960s. There has been nostalgia for Basil Brush, the 1966 FIFA World Cup and for 1960s women's fashion.

Nostalgia television programmes about the 1960s include Those Glory Glory Days (1983), Heartbeat (1992), Oh, Doctor Beeching! (1995) and Rock & Chips (2010). Endeavour (2012) is a retro television programme about the 1960s. Retro films about the 1960s include Stardust (1974), Quadrophenia (1979) and Brighton Rock (2010).

1960s music was the most popular decade's music in 2013. 1960s music was the second most popular decade's music in 2017. There has been nostalgia for the 1960s music of The Beatles, Procol Harum, The Rolling Stones and Billy Fury. "Green Onions" (1962) reached number 7 on the UK singles chart in 1980. Ben E. King's "Stand by Me" (1961) reached number 1 on that chart in 1987. A remix of Elvis Presley's "A Little Less Conversation" (1968) reached number 1 on that chart in 2002. 1960s retro music has been produced by Little Barrie. Sounds of the Sixties (1991) is a 1960s nostalgia documentary. Absolute Radio 60s is a 1960s nostalgia radio station.

== United States ==
Apollo insignia

There is nostalgia for the Apollo missions. There has been nostalgia for The Monkees. In 2013, 15% of Americans wanted to time travel to the 1960s more than any other decade, and the 1960s was the second most popular decade overall. 1960s music was the joint third most popular decade's music in 2021.

Nostalgia television programmes about the 1960s include The Wonder Years (1988), Mad Men (2007) and Pan Am (2011). Retro television programmes about the 1960s include It (1990) and Dark Skies (1996). Star Trek Continues (2013) is a retro series which reproduces the appearance of the 1960s television programme. Nostalgia films about the 1960s include Cooley High (1975), Our Winning Season (1978), Big Wednesday (1978), Animal House (1978), I Wanna Hold Your Hand (1978), The Wanderers (1979), Four Friends (1981), Baby It's You (1983), The Outsiders (1983), Peggy Sue Got Married (1986), Dirty Dancing (1987), 1969 (1988), That Thing You Do! (1996), Catch Me If You Can (2002), Down with Love (2003) and Apollo 10½: A Space Age Childhood (2022). Return of the Secaucus 7 (1980) and The Big Chill (1983) are nostalgia films about reunions of people who were younger in the 1960s. Once Upon a Time in Hollywood (2019) is a 1960s retro film.

== See also ==
- 1950s nostalgia
- 1970s nostalgia
- 1980s nostalgia
- 1990s nostalgia
