= 1990s nostalgia =

Sentimentality for the 1990s

1990s nostalgia is nostalgia for certain aspects of the 1990s. 1990s nostalgia is a form of decade nostalgia. 1990s retro is retro related to the 1990s.

== Demographics ==
According to a 2023 GWI poll, 61% of Generation Y, born between 1983 and 1996, had nostalgia for media from the 1990s in twelve markets. The same was true of 55% of Generation X born between 1964 and 1982.

== Music ==
A 2010 Music Choice Europe survey of people in Europe found that the 1990s was the second most popular decade for music. In 2023, GWI said that the 1990s was the most popular decade for music among Generation Z. There have been reissues of 1990s rave music. There are 1990s nostalgia radio stations.

== Film and television ==
There has been nostalgia for Home Alone, Jurassic Park, Babylon 5, The X Files, Farscape Mr. Bean and The Fresh Prince of Bel-Air.

== Australia ==
There is nostalgia for the television programme Round the Twist.

== Ireland ==
There is nostalgia for Father Ted.

== Japan ==
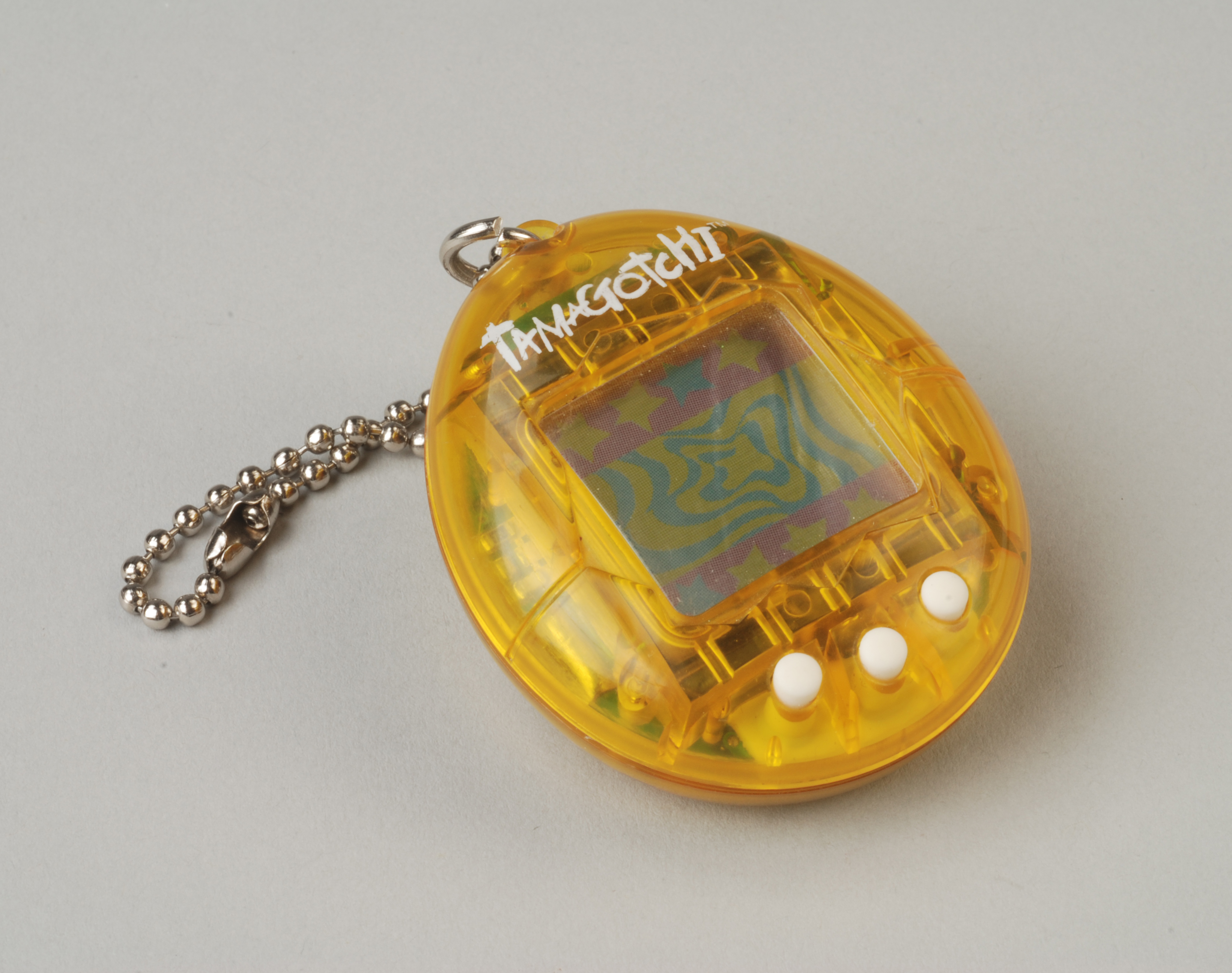
Tamagotchi from 1997

In Japan, 1990s nostalgia is part of the broader phenomenon of Heisei nostalgia and "Heisei retro". There is nostalgia for the 1990s music of Kohmi Hirose, Nanase Aikawa, Spitz and Ringo Sheena; for 1990s toys such as Tamagotchi and Beyblade; and for 1990s characters such as Tarepanda. 1990s fashions, such as loose socks, elements of 1990s Gyaru, and 1990s makeup, have been revived. Sunny (2018) is a 1990s nostalgia film. There have been reboots of 1990s television series such as Sailor Moon and Neon Genesis Evangelion.

== Korea ==
20th Century Girl (2022) is a nostalgia film about the 1990s.

== Philippines ==
One Hit Wonder (2025) is a 1990s nostalgia film.

== United Kingdom ==
There has been nostalgia for the 1990s music of Radiohead, The Verve, Toploader and Oasis; and for The Crystal Maze, Keeping up Appearances, the Orange Man, Britpop and 1990s raves. There have been revivals of 1990s food branding.

1990s nostalgia music television channels have included Now 90s and MTV 90s. There have been 1990s nostalgia documentaries, radio scheduling, performances, restaurants and experiential theatre. Heart 90s and Absolute Radio 90s are 1990s nostalgia radio stations.

1990s music was the fourth most popular decade's music in 2017. There have been reunions of 1990s bands. The Battle (2026) is a 1990s nostalgia play.

Briscoe said that 1990s nostalgia frequently views the 1990s through an American lens that does not accurately reflect 1990s Britain.

== United States ==
There has been nostalgia for Seinfeld, Frasier, Friends, 1990s children's television and 1990s fashion. There is 1990s nostalgia among Generation Y. In 2013, the 1990s was one of two decades that people aged between 18 and 29 wanted to time travel to more than any other decade. There have been 1990s nostalgia conventions.

Nostalgia films about the 1990s include The Wackness (2008), Landline (2017), Mid90s (2018), Caught Stealing (2025) and Backrooms (2026). Nostalgia television programmes about the 1990s include Everything Sucks! (2018), That '90s Show (2023), Love Story (2026) and Elle (2026). Julie and the Phantoms (2020) is a 1990s retro television programme. 1990s nostalgia television scheduling has included The '90s Are All That. There have been sequels to 1990s films, such as the 2012 sequel to Men in Black. There have been reboots of 1990s television series.

1990s music was the joint third most popular decade's music in 2016. 1990s music was the third most popular decade's music in 2021. 1990s music was the most popular decade's music for streaming, as of 2025. The Goo Goo Dolls' song "Iris" (1998) was still popular in 2026.

== See also ==
- 1950s nostalgia
- 1960s nostalgia
- 1970s nostalgia
- 1980s nostalgia
- 2010s in fashion#1990s revival
- 2020s in fashion#Late 1990s–2000s revival
