= ABC Commissary =

Quick service restaurant at Disney's Hollywood Studios

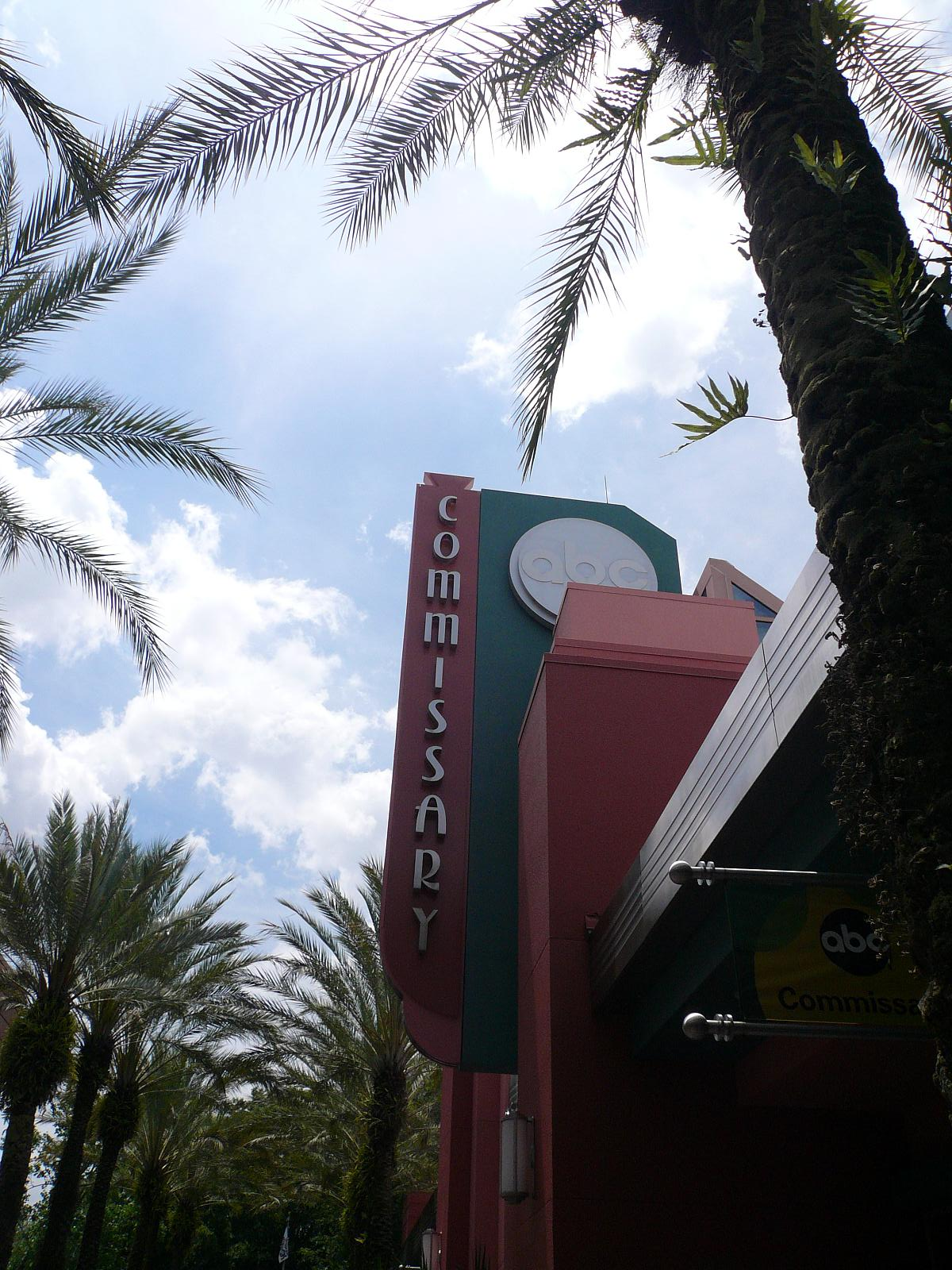
- The exterior of the ABC Commissary
- Interactive map of ABC Commissary

Restaurant information
- Owner: Disney Experiences
- Location: Bay Lake, Orange County, Florida, United States
- Coordinates: 28.3560773°N 81.5602446°W
- Website: Official website

The ABC Commissary is a restaurant on Commissary Lane at Disney's Hollywood Studios, one of the four main theme parks at Walt Disney World. The restaurant has an Art Deco design. It is more popular than the other counter service restaurants in the park, and offers a larger variety of menu options. The ABC Commissary's menu is themed to programs broadcast by American Broadcasting Company (ABC), including such items as Down the Hatch (fried fish), a reference to the hatch in the television series Lost. The restaurant also offers a fried prawn burger. The deep-fried foods on the menu do not contain trans fat. In 2013, the ABC Commissary was one of several restaurants in the park to offer apple pie cupcakes in celebration of Independence Day. The ABC Commissary is located next to the Sci-Fi Dine-In Theater Restaurant. In The Unofficial Guide to Walt Disney World with Kids 2012, Bob Sehlinger and Liliane Opsomer write that the ABC Commissary is "hard to find" but "usually not too crowded".
