= Chieko Matsumoto =

Japanese singer and actress

Chieko Matsumoto (Japanese: 松本ちえこ, 12 November 1959–17 November 2019) was a Japanese idol, tarento, singer and actress. She was famous for starring in television commercials for Shiseido's Basubon (Japanese: バスボン) (1976). Her song Koibito Shiken (Japanese: 恋人試験) (1976) reached number 5 on the Japanese singles chart. She was awarded the graph award (Japanese: グラフ賞) at the 14th Golden Arrow Awards in 1976.

== Music ==
Four of her albums, not previously released on CD, were released for streaming in 2022. Her music includes Christmas music.

== Discography ==
She released the following singles:

- Boyfriend (Japanese: ボーイフレンド) (1974)
- Mabushii Kare (Japanese: まぶしい彼) (1974)
- Koibito Shiken (Japanese: 恋人試験) (1976). This single reached number 5 on the Oricon chart. This single was number 7 in the chart published in Cash Box on 28 August 1976, but no chart was published the following week.
- Koibito Gansho (Japanese: 恋人願書) (1976). This single reached number 20 on the Oricon chart, according to the Oricon website.
- Boku (Japanese: ぼく) (1976). This single reached number 30 on the Oricon chart, according to the Oricon website.
- Hi! Jugyochu (Japanese: ハイ!授業中) (1977). This single reached number 42 on the Oricon chart, according to the Oricon website.
- Umibe No Aitsu (Japanese: 海辺のあいつ) (1977)
- Omoidebusoku (Japanese: おもいで不足) (1977)
- Flower Message (Japanese: フラワー・メッセージ) (1977)
- Wonderful Hero (Japanese: ワンダフル・ヒーロー) (1978)
- Kawaii Anata (Japanese: かわいい貴方) (1979)

She released the following studio albums:

- Chieko No Viva Animals!! (Japanese: ちえこのViva Animals!!) (1976)
- Chieko No Hello Winter (Japanese: ちえこのハロー・ウインター) (1976)
- Hi! Jugyochu (Japanese: ハイ！授業中) (1977)
- Hi! Tomodachi (Japanese: ハーイ！ともだち) (1977)
- Kankaku Toshi (Japanese: 感覚都市) (1978)
- Wonder Caravan (Japanese: ワンダー・キャラバン) (1978)

In 1987, a compilation album was included in the Playback Series (Japanese: プレイバック・シリーズ).
