= Hollywood & Vine (restaurant) =

Restaurant at Disney's Hollywood Studios

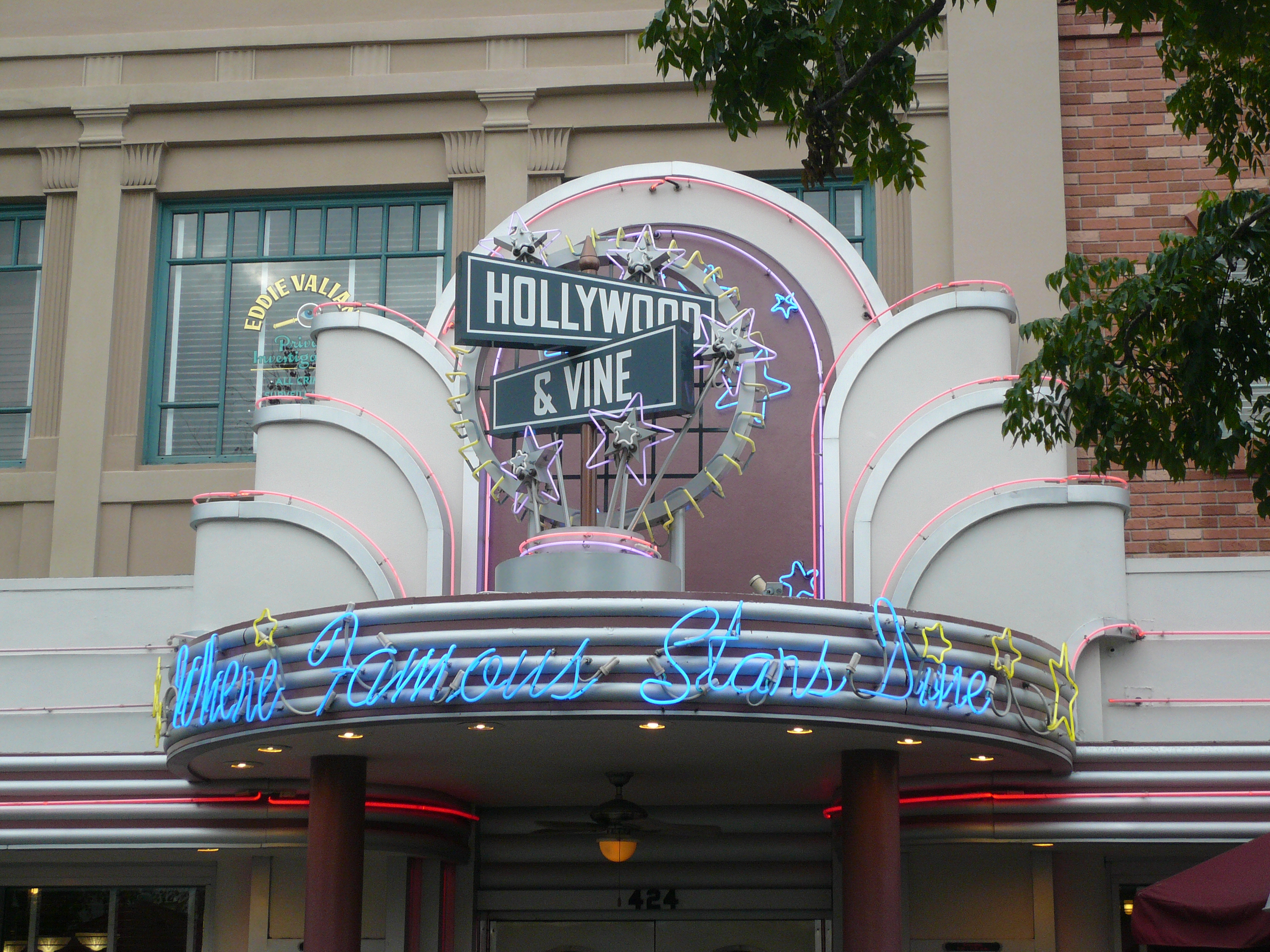
- The exterior of Hollywood & Vine
- Interactive map of Hollywood & Vine

Restaurant information
- Owner: Disney Experiences
- Location: Bay Lake, Orange County, Florida, United States
- Coordinates: 28.3574159°N 81.5590005°W
- Website: Official website

Hollywood & Vine (formerly Hollywood & Vine Cafeteria of the Stars) is a restaurant located next to the 50's Prime Time Café in Disney's Hollywood Studios, one of the four main theme parks at Walt Disney World. Both beer and wine are served at Hollywood & Vine. Hollywood & Vine is one of three restaurants in the park that offer early entry into the show Fantasmic!

Prior to 1998, the restaurant was called Hollywood & Vine Cafeteria; "of the Stars" was added to the name that year in recognition of the restaurant's newly instituted star-themed character meals. In 2003, there were twenty character meals offered at Walt Disney World, during which actors portraying various Disney characters would interact with guests while they ate at the parks' restaurants, and Disney was in the process of increasing the presence of costumed characters in the parks at the time. Nonetheless, Minnie Mouse character meals held at Hollywood & Vine were discontinued that year, and Robert Johnson of the Orlando Sentinel partially attributed this cancellation to competition from the Sci-Fi Dine-In, which he said "almost always has a line of customers waiting." Hollywood & Vine had resumed its Minnie Mouse character meals by 2005. By 2012, the character meals had been changed to be Playhouse Disney-themed. By 2015, the Playhouse Disney characters had been switched out for Disney Junior characters.

During Star Wars Weekends, the restaurant offers Jedi Mickey's Star Wars Dine, a character meal with Star Wars-themed decorations, music, and food.

== Bibliography ==
- Cochran, Jason. Pauline Frommer's Walt Disney World and Orlando (2 ed.). John Wiley & Sons. ISBN 0470522496.
- Gindin, Rona (2012). The Little Black Book of Walt Disney World. Peter Pauper Press. ISBN 144131296X.
- Sehlinger, Bob; Len Testa (2014). The Unofficial Guide to Walt Disney World 2015. Unofficial Guides. ISBN 1628090200.
- Shumaker, Susan; Than Saffel (2003). Vegetarian Walt Disney World and Greater Orlando: The Essential Guide for the Health-Conscious Traveler. Globe Pequot Press. ISBN 0762727039.
- Wiley, Kim Wright (2005). Fodor's Walt Disney World with Kids 2006. Fodor's. ISBN 140001574X.
- Zibart, Eve; David Hoekstra (2009). Unofficial Guide to Walt Disney World for Grown-Ups. John Wiley & Sons. ISBN 0470497394.
