= Ed Bumgardner =

American music journalist

- Born: 1953 (age 72–73)
- Occupations: Journalist; editor

Ed Bumgardner (born 1953) is an American music journalist and musician. His work has appeared in Rolling Stone, Spin and East Coast Rocker, among other publications.

Bumgardner began playing bass at age 13 and toured with bands through his 20s and 30s. He backed several musicians, including Chuck Berry, Bo Diddley and the Drifters.

Between 1985 and 2009, Bumgardner was the music and entertainment writer for the Winston-Salem Journal, later becoming assistant editor.

In 2019, having lost several bandmates to alcohol and drugs, Bumgardner and Rob Slater, raised money for the Be Good to Yourself initiative by recording a benefit album. Bumgardner gave up drinking in 2015. Other contributors to the album included Peter Holsapple, Mitch Easter and Don Dixon.

As of 2026, Bumgardner is staff writer at Camel City Dispatch and WSArts magazine.
