= Nostalgia =

Sentimental longing for the past

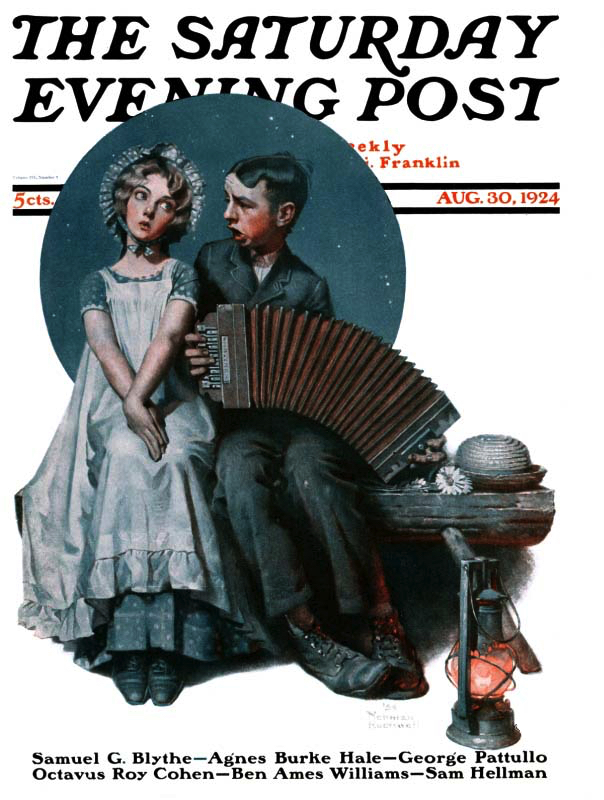
The archives director for The Saturday Evening Post said that the magazine has been regarded with "a mixture of nostalgia and affection". Shown: a Norman Rockwell cover from August 1924.

Nostalgia is an emotion which is often described as a bittersweet longing for the past, typically for a period of time accompanied by happy memories or emotions. It is often described as a sort of sad pleasure, which typically involves longing for a past memory, whether real or romanticized, that cannot be recovered. It can also refer to a type of homesickness.

The word nostalgia is a neoclassical compound derived from Greek, consisting of νόστος (nóstos), a Homeric word meaning "homecoming", and ἄλγος (álgos), meaning "pain"; the word was coined by a 17th-century medical student to describe the anxieties displayed by Swiss mercenaries fighting away from home. Described as a medical condition—a form of melancholy—in the early modern period, it became an important trope in Romanticism.

Nostalgia is associated with a longing for the past, its personalities, possibilities, and events, usually described as the "good old days" or the "glory days". There is a predisposition, caused by cognitive biases such as rosy retrospection, for people to view the past more positively and the future more negatively. When applied to one's beliefs about a society or institution, this is called declinism, which has been described as "a trick of the mind" and as "an emotional strategy, something comforting to snuggle up to when the present day seems intolerably bleak".

The scientific literature on nostalgia usually refers to nostalgia regarding one's personal life and has mainly studied the effects of nostalgia as induced during these studies. Emotion is a strong provoker of nostalgia due to the processing of these stimuli first passing through the amygdala, the emotional seat of the brain. These recollections of one's past are usually important events, people about whom one cares, and places where one has spent time. Cultural phenomena such as music, movies, television shows, and video games, as well as natural phenomena such as weather and environment, can also be strong triggers of nostalgia.

== Functions ==
Nostalgia's definition has changed greatly over time. Consistent with its Greek word roots meaning "homecoming" and "pain", nostalgia was for centuries considered a potentially debilitating and sometimes fatal medical condition characterized by expressing extreme homesickness. The modern view is that nostalgia is an independent, and even positive, emotion that many people experience often. Nostalgia has been found to have important psychological functions, such as to improve mood, increase social connectedness, enhance positive self-regard, and provide existential meaning. Nostalgia can lead individuals to perceive the past more favorably than the present, a phenomenon known as the "nostalgia effect," which is classified as a cognitive bias. Many nostalgic reflections serve more than one function, and overall seem to benefit those who experience them. Such benefits may lead to a chronic disposition or personality trait of "nostalgia proneness." Nostalgia has also been associated with learning and memory consolidation.

=== Improving mood ===
Although nostalgia is often triggered by negative feelings, it results in increasing one's mood and heightening positive emotions, which can stem from feelings of warmth or coping resulting from nostalgic reflections. One way to improve mood is to effectively cope with problems that hinder one's happiness. Batcho (2013) found that nostalgia proneness positively related to successful methods of coping throughout all stages—planning and implementing strategies, and reframing the issue positively. These studies led to the conclusion that the coping strategies that are likely among nostalgia-prone people often lead to benefits during stressful times. Nostalgia can be connected to more focus on coping strategies and implementing them, thus increasing support in challenging times.

=== Increasing social connectedness ===
Nostalgia sometimes involves memories of people one was close to, such as family members, romantic lovers, or friends, and thus it can increase one's sense of social support and connections. Nostalgia is also triggered specifically by feelings of loneliness, but counteracts such feelings with reflections of close relationships. According to Zhou et al. (2008), lonely people often have lesser perceptions of social support. Loneliness, however, leads to nostalgia, which actually increases perceptions of social support. Thus, Zhou and colleagues (2008) concluded that nostalgia serves a restorative function for individuals regarding their social connectedness.

=== Preserving cultural heritage ===
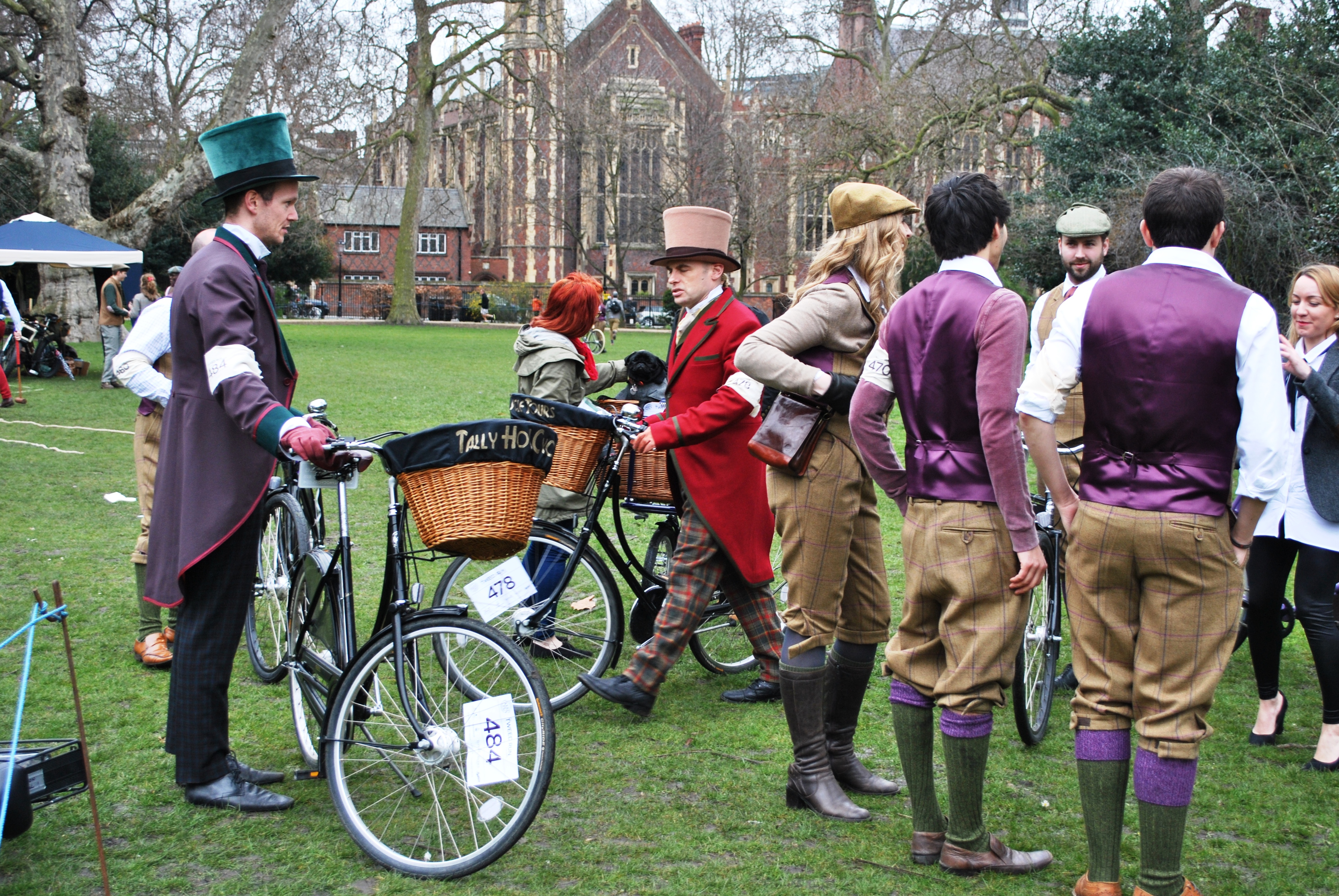
Tweed run, 2013

Nostalgia serves as a motivator for the preservation of people's cultural heritage. People endeavor to conserve buildings, landscapes, and other artifacts of historical significance out of nostalgia for past times. They are often motivated by a desire to connect to their heritage from past generations. This can manifest in living history events such as historical reenactments, which bring together people with a shared nostalgia for historical periods of past times. These events' hands-on, improvisational natures often facilitate socialization.

=== Enhancing positive self-regard ===
Nostalgia serves as a coping mechanism and helps people to feel better about themselves. Vess et al. (2012) found that the subjects who thought of nostalgic memories showed greater accessibility of positive characteristics than those who thought of exciting future experiences. Additionally, in a second study conducted, some participants were exposed to nostalgic engagement and reflection while the other group was not. The researchers looked again at self-attributes and found that the participants who were not exposed to nostalgic experiences reflected a pattern of selfish and self-centered attributes. Vess et al. (2012), however, found that this effect had weakened and become less powerful among the participants who engaged in nostalgic reflection.

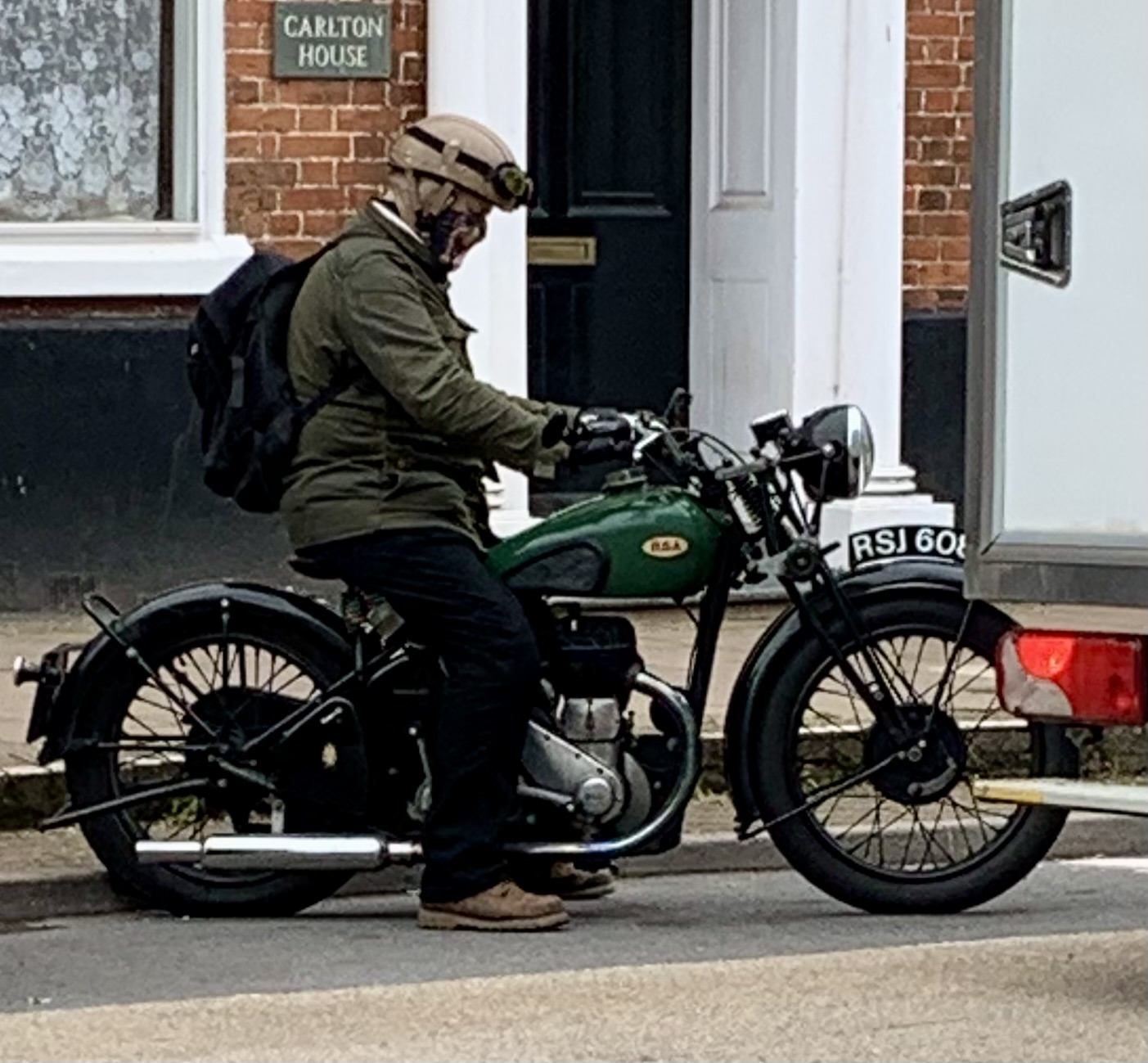
Rider in vintage clothing astride a vintage BSA motorcycle on High Street in Honiton, England, in July 2023

=== Providing existential meaning ===
Nostalgia helps increase one's self-esteem and meaning in life by buffering threats to well-being and also by initiating a desire to deal with problems or stress. Routledge (2011) and colleagues found that nostalgia correlates positively with one's sense of meaning in life. The second study revealed that nostalgia increases one's perceived meaning in life, which was thought to be mediated by a sense of social support or connectedness. Thirdly, the researchers found that threatened meaning can even act as a trigger for nostalgia, thus increasing one's nostalgic reflections.

By triggering nostalgia, though, one's defensiveness to such threat is minimized as found in the fourth study. The final two studies found that nostalgia is able not only to create meaning, but also to buffer threats to meaning by breaking the connection between a lack of meaning and one's well-being. Follow-up studies also completed by Routledge in 2012 not only found meaning as a function of nostalgia, but also concluded that nostalgic people have greater perceived meaning, search for meaning less, and can better buffer existential threat.

=== Promoting psychological growth ===
Nostalgia makes people more willing to engage in growth-oriented behaviors and encourages them to view themselves as growth-oriented people. Baldwin and Landau (2014) found that nostalgia leads people to rate themselves higher on items like "I am the kind of person who embraces unfamiliar people, events, and places." Nostalgia also increased interest in growth-related behavior such as "I would like to explore someplace that I have never been before." In the first study, these effects were statistically mediated by nostalgia-induced positive affect—the extent to which nostalgia made participants feel good. In the second study, nostalgia led to the same growth outcomes but the effects were statistically mediated by nostalgia-induced self-esteem.

=== As a deception ===
One recent study critiques the idea of nostalgia, which in some forms can become a defense mechanism by which people avoid the historical facts. This study looked at the different portrayals of apartheid in South Africa and argued that nostalgia appears as two ways: "restorative nostalgia", a wish to return to that past, and "reflective nostalgia", which is more critically aware.

=== As a comfort ===
Reliving past memories may provide comfort and contribute to mental health. One notable recent medical study has looked at the physiological effects thinking about past "good" memories can have. They found that thinking about the past "fondly" actually increased perceptions of physical warmth.

=== As a political tool ===
In a 2014 study conducted by Routledge, he and a team observed that the more people reported having major disruptions and uncertainties in their lives, the more they nostalgically longed for the past. Routledge suggests that by invoking the idea of an idealized past, politicians can provoke the social and cultural anxieties and uncertainties that make nostalgia especially attractive—and effective—as a tool of political persuasion.

== Trigger factors ==
=== Cultural ===
==== Books ====
A person can deliberately trigger feelings of nostalgia by listening to familiar music, looking at old photos, or visiting comforting environments of the past. With this knowledge widely available, many books have been published specifically to evoke the feeling of nostalgia.

==== Music ====
Hearing an old song can bring back memories for a person. A song heard once at a specific moment and then not heard again until a far later date will give the listener a sense of nostalgia for the date remembered and events that occurred then. However, if it is heard throughout life, it may lose its association with any specific period or experience.

==== Movies ====
Old movies can trigger nostalgia. This is particularly true for generations who grew up as children during specific film eras, such as the animation renaissance of the 1990s. Rewatching classic movies can be therapeutic in nature, healing emotional wounds using happy childhood memories.

==== TV shows ====
Old television shows can trigger nostalgia. People gravitate towards shows they watched as children, as the memories from one's youth are often the most significant of their lives. This tendency is also reflected in practices such as Comfort television, where viewers return to familiar programs for emotional comfort and nostalgia.

==== Video games ====
Old video games can trigger nostalgia. Retro gaming has become a recreational activity among older generations who played them as children.

=== Environmental ===
==== Geography ====
Specific locations can trigger nostalgia. Such places are often associated with an individual's past, reminding them of their past childhood, relationships, or achievements. They may include the homes where they grew up with their families, the schools they attended with friends, or the venues they visited for dating and marriage.

==== Nature ====
Nature-based factors such as weather and temperature can trigger nostalgia. Scientific studies have shown that cold weather makes people more nostalgic, while nostalgia causes people to feel warmer. In some societies, elements of nature often trigger a nostalgia for past times when nature played a larger role in culture. Environmental philosopher Glenn Albrecht coined the term "solastalgia" in his 2003 book Solastalgia: a new concept in human health and identity. The word is formed from the Latin sōlācium (comfort) and the Greek root ἄλγος (pain, suffering) to describe a form of emotional or existential distress caused by environmental destruction. Nostalgia differs from solastalgia because nostalgia is typically generated by spatial separation from important places or persons (one's home, family, friends, or loved ones) with which it is often possible, in principle, to reconnect. With solastalgia, in contrast, the grief is typically caused by environmental destruction, so the separation between subject and object is ontological rather than spatial: it is permanent and unbridgeable, and can be experienced while continuing to occupy the same irreversibly degraded place.

== Other aspects ==
=== As a medical condition ===
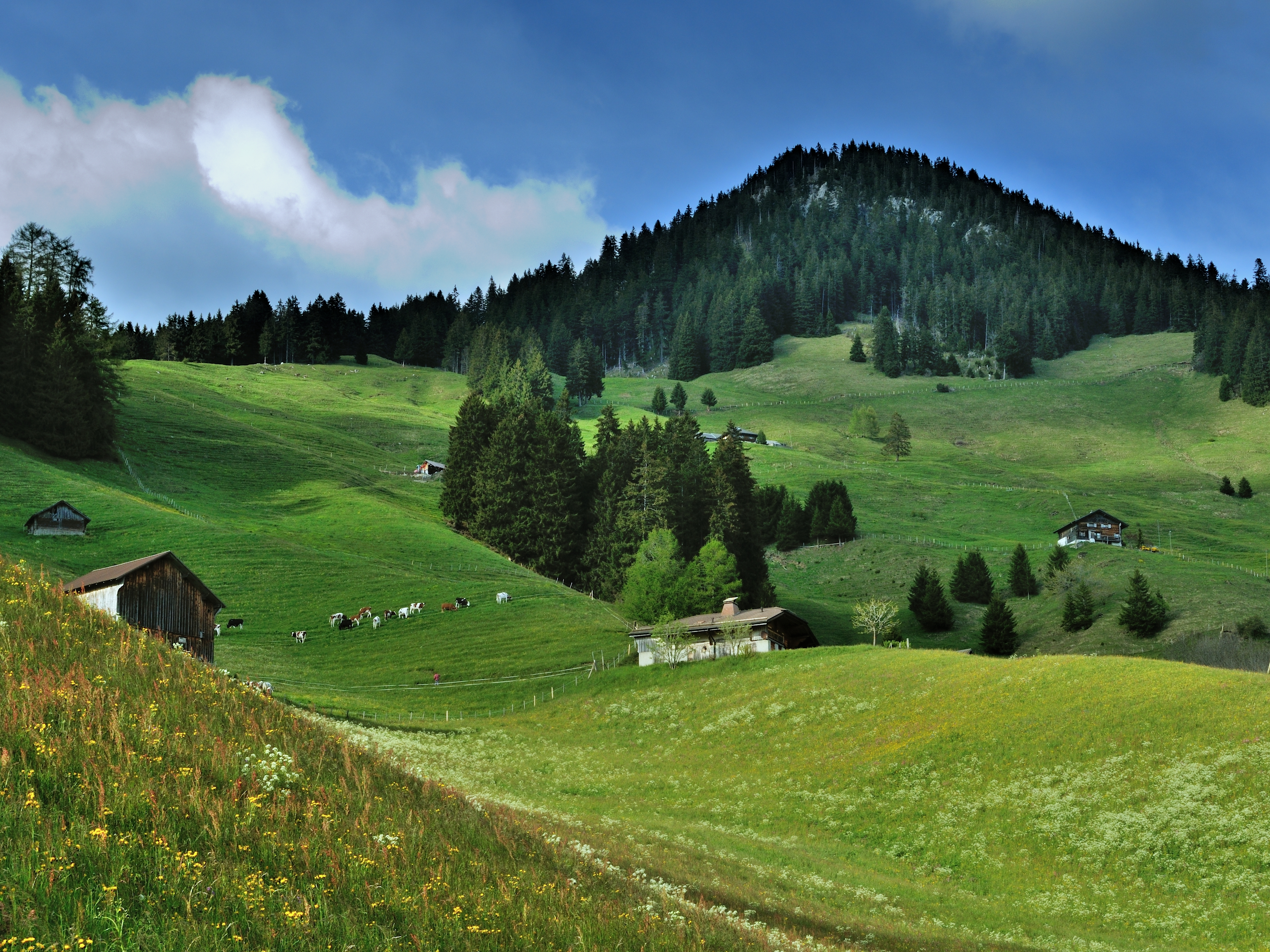
A rural landscape in Vaud, Switzerland. The term "nostalgia" originally referred to the homesickness felt by Swiss mercenaries.

The term was coined in 1688 by Johannes Hofer (1669–1752) in his dissertation in Basel. The word nostalgia was compound of the ancient Greek words nóstos (return home) and algia (pain). Hofer introduced nostalgia or mal du pays, "homesickness", for the condition also known as mal du Suisse, "Swiss illness", because of its frequent occurrence in Swiss mercenaries who in the plains of Switzerland were pining for their landscapes. Symptoms were also thought to include fainting, high fever, and death.

English homesickness is a loan translation of nostalgia. Sir Joseph Banks used the word in his journal during the first voyage of Captain Cook. On 3 September 1770, he stated that the sailors "were now pretty far gone with the longing for home which the Physicians have gone so far as to esteem a disease under the name of Nostalgia", but his journal was not published in his lifetime. Cases resulting in death were known and soldiers were sometimes successfully treated by being discharged and sent home. Receiving a diagnosis was, however, generally regarded as an insult.

In the eighteenth century, scientists were looking for a locus of nostalgia, a nostalgic bone. By the 1850s, nostalgia was losing its status as a particular disease and coming to be seen rather as a symptom or stage of a pathological process. It was considered as a form of melancholia and a predisposing condition among suicides. Nostalgia was, however, still diagnosed among soldiers as late as the American Civil War. By the 1870s, interest in nostalgia as a medical category had almost completely vanished. Nostalgia was still being recognized in both the First and Second World Wars, especially by the American armed forces. Great lengths were taken to study and understand the condition to stem the tide of troops leaving the front in droves (see the BBC documentary Century of the Self).

Nostalgia is triggered by something reminding an individual of an event or item from their past. The resulting emotion can vary from happiness to sorrow. The term "feeling nostalgic" is more commonly used to describe pleasurable emotions associated with, or a longing to return to, a particular period of time.

=== Romanticism ===
Swiss nostalgia was linked to the singing of Ranz des vaches or Kuhreihen, which were forbidden to Swiss mercenaries because they led to nostalgia to the point of desertion, illness or death. The 1767 Dictionnaire de Musique by Jean-Jacques Rousseau claims that Swiss mercenaries were threatened with severe punishment to prevent them from singing their Swiss songs. It became somewhat of a topos in Romantic literature, and figures in the poem Der Schweizer by Achim von Arnim (1805) and in Clemens Brentano's Des Knaben Wunderhorn (1809), as well as in the opera Le Chalet, by Adolphe Charles Adam (1834), which was performed for Queen Victoria under the title The Swiss Cottage. The Romantic connection of nostalgia was a significant factor in the enthusiasm for Switzerland and the development of early tourism in Switzerland that took hold of the European cultural elite in the 19th century. German Romanticism coined an opposite to Heimweh, Fernweh "far-sickness", "longing to be far away", like wanderlust, expressing the Romantic desire to travel and explore.

=== In rhetoric and communication ===
Nostalgia has been frequently studied as a tool of rhetoric and persuasion. Communication scholar Stephen Depoe, for example, writes that in nostalgic messaging: "a speaker highlights a comparison between a more favorable, idealized past and a less favorable present in order to stimulate [nostalgia]... [linking] his/her own policies to qualities of the idealized past in order to induce support" (179). Rhetorician William Kurlinkus taxonomizes nostalgia on this foundation, arguing that nostalgic rhetoric generally contains three parts:

1. A loss or threat in the present: the chaotic change that nostalgia responds to. Though some theorists argue that the ideal must truly be lost, other scholars including Kurlinkus argue that the ideal may simply be threatened to trigger nostalgia.
2. A nostalgic crux: a person, group, corporation, et al. that is blamed for the loss of the nostalgic ideal. To perform such scapegoating, the nostalgic crux is usually presented as a force of newness and change. Defeating this outsider is positioned as a source of recovering the good memory. Such cruxes have included groups from polluting corporations to immigrants.
3. Hope: Finally, Kurlinkus argues that though nostalgia is often performed ironically, it almost always has a true hope for recovering the good memory (whether this means some kind of true restoration or a more symbolic recovery of an ethic). Such hope differentiates nostalgia from similar emotions like melancholia, which contains all of nostalgia's longing for lost ideals without a desire to move out of that past.

Kurlinkus coined the term "nostalgic other" to describe the ways in which some populations of people become trapped in other people's nostalgic stories of them, idealized as natural while simultaneously denied sovereignty or the right to change in the present. "Nostalgic others differ from other scholarly discourse in that their alterity is not primarily based in race or ethnicity", Kurlinkus wrote. "Rather, in concurrent identifications and divisions, the nostalgic other is distinguished from the rhetor by time. We live in the present; they live in the past. The creation of the nostalgic other allows mainstream populations to commodify the racial purity and stability of the past but refuses the community agency to change in the present by highlighting its negative traits."

=== As an advertising tool ===
In media and advertising, nostalgia-evoking images, sounds, and references can be used strategically to create a sense of connectedness between consumers and products with the goal of convincing the public to consume, watch, or buy advertised products. Modern technology facilitates nostalgia-eliciting advertising through the subject, style, and design of an advertisement. The feeling of longing for the past is easily communicated through social media and advertising because these media require the participation of multiple senses, are able to represent their ideas entirely, and therefore become more reminiscent of life.

Due to efficient advertising schemes, consumers need not have experienced a specific event or moment in time in order to feel nostalgic for it. This is due to a phenomenon referred to as vicarious nostalgia. Vicarious nostalgia is a feeling of wistful yearning for a moment that occurred prior to, or outside of, the span of one's memory, but is relatable (has sentimental value) due to repeated mediated exposure to it. The constant propagating of advertisements and other media messages makes vicarious nostalgia possible, and changes the ways we understand advertisements and, subsequently, the way consumers use their purchasing power.

Developed within the marketing discipline, forestalgia, defined as an individual's yearning for an idealized future, serves as a future-focused counterpart to nostalgia. Like nostalgia, where only the happy memories are retained, forestalgia explains customers' intentions to escape the present to a romanticized future where current concerns are no longer an issue. Marketing researchers found that when promoting hedonic and utilitarian products, far-past nostalgia and far-future forestalgia advertisements were most effective in the promotion of utilitarian products. In contrast, hedonic products were better suited for advertisements framed in far-past nostalgia or near-future forestalgia.

=== Forms of nostalgia ===
Decade nostalgia existed by the 1930s, when there was nostalgia for the 1890s. Subsequently, there has been, amongst others, 1950s nostalgia, 1960s nostalgia, 1970s nostalgia, 1980s nostalgia, and 1990s nostalgia. There may be nostalgia for a decade before the end of that decade. Decade nostalgia breaks nostalgia into blocks which may cut across genre boundaries and which may not reflect the actual dates of changes in culture.

Anemoia, also known as vicarious nostalgia or historical nostalgia, is nostalgia for a moment that occurred prior to, or outside of, the span of one's memory.

=== Nostalgia cycle ===
It has been argued that there is a nostalgia cycle. Various durations of this cycle have been alleged, including epicycles (i.e., nostalgia for the last nostalgia cycle). Reynolds said that, if a twenty-year nostalgia cycle applied, then 1980s nostalgia would have ended c. 2010. In 2016, Chaney said that this had not happened, and that a twenty-year nostalgia cycle did not appear to apply. It has been said that, if one believed in nostalgia cycles, then the popularity of Mad Men in the 2010s would require 1960s nostalgia to follow a forty-year nostalgia cycle.

It has been argued that the nostalgia cycle has been disrupted, and thus has ceased to exist, or changed its duration to become longer or shorter; and it has been argued that cable television and the Internet are what disrupted it. Wickman argued that the nostalgia cycle never existed, and that belief in its existence is based on cherry-picked evidence.

== See also ==
- Americana
- Declinism
- Golden age (metaphor)
- Gay Nineties
- Hauntology
- Hiraeth
- Historic preservation
- Nostalgia for apartheid
- Nostalgia industry
- Nostalgia Night
- Old-time radio
- Recency bias
- Retro style
- Rosy retrospection
- Saudade
- Sehnsucht
- Solastalgia
- Vintage (design)

=== Japanese ===
- Mono no aware
- Shōwa nostalgia
- Heisei nostalgia

=== Communist ===
- Communist nostalgia
- Neo-Stalinism
- Nostalgia for the Polish People's Republic
- Nostalgia for the Soviet Union
- Ostalgie
- Yugo-nostalgia

=== Aesthetics ===
- Vaporwave
- Y2K (aesthetic)

=== By decade ===
- 1950s nostalgia
- 1960s nostalgia
- 1970s nostalgia
- 1980s nostalgia
- 1990s nostalgia
