= 50's Prime Time Café =

Restaurant at Disney's Hollywood Studios

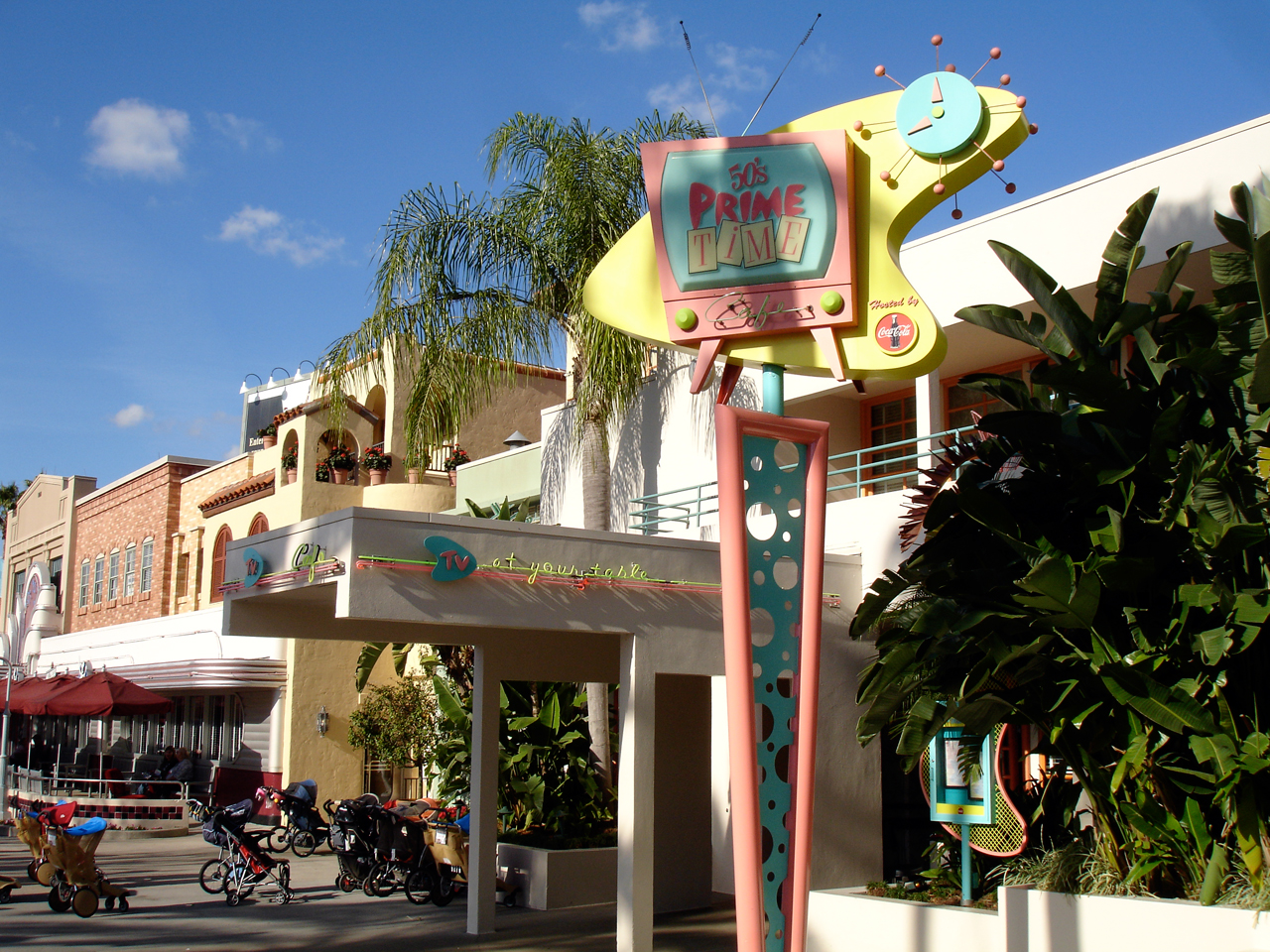
- Entrance
- Interactive map of 50's Prime Time Café

Restaurant information
- Established: 1989
- Owner: Disney Experiences
- Location: Bay Lake, Orange County, Florida, United States
- Coordinates: 28.3574468123°N 81.5587105705°W
- Sponsor: Coca-Cola
- Website: Official website

The 50's Prime Time Café is a restaurant at Disney's Hollywood Studios, one of the four main theme parks at Walt Disney World. The restaurant replicates the kitsch of a 1950s diner. The waitresses dress similarly to Leave It to Beaver character June Cleaver, and each acts as though she is the mother of the guests she is serving, to the point of scolding and giving (mild) discipline to the patrons if they are "misbehaving" (similar to the concept of themed restaurants such as Ed Debevic's (a 1950s-themed diner in Chicago) and Dick's Last Resort, where the servers are specifically trained to be obnoxious). While eating, guests watch 1950s television shows such as Leave It to Beaver and Topper on black-and-white televisions.

Menu items include chicken pot pie, pot roast, fried chicken, meatloaf, and milkshakes. The 50's Prime Time Café opened in 1989. Two years later, another theme restaurant opened at the park: the Sci-Fi Dine-In Theater Restaurant; the 50's Prime Time Café had garnered much success, and Disney hoped that another restaurant that had a strong emphasis on theme would have a similar level of success. The Sci-Fi Dine-In initially received little interest, but, within five weeks of opening, it was serving between 1,500 and 2,000 meals on a daily basis, just as the 50's Prime Time Café was doing. These restaurants are two of the three in the park that currently offer table service, the other being the Hollywood Brown Derby In the book Walt Disney World Resort: Also Includes SeaWorld and Central Florida, Corey Sandler writes that the 50's Prime Time Café ties with the Beaches and Cream Soda Shop at Disney's Beach Club Resort for the best milkshakes in Walt Disney World.

== Bibliography ==
- Gindin, Rona; Jennifer Greenhill-Taylor (2011). Fodor's 2012 Walt Disney World. Fodor's Travel Publications. ISBN 978-0679009481.
- Goldsbury, Cara (2010). The Luxury Guide to Walt Disney World Resort: How to Get the Most Out of the Best Disney Has to Offer. Globe Pequot Press. ISBN 978-0762767021.
- Lafray, Joyce (2005). Joyce Lafray's Big Guide to Florida Restaurants. Seaside Publishing. ISBN 1419607995.
- O'Halloran, Jacinta (2007). Florida 2008. Fodor's Travel Publications. ISBN 978-1400017966.
- Sandler, Corey (2007). Walt Disney World Resort: Also Includes Seaworld and Central Florida. Globe Pequot Press. ISBN 978-0762741694.
- Shumaker, Susan; Than Saffel (2003). Vegetarian Walt Disney World and Greater Orlando: The Essential Guide for the Health-Conscious Traveler. Globe Pequot Press. ISBN 0762727039.
- Wiley, Kim Wright; Leigh C. W. Jenkins (2012). Walt Disney World with Kids 2013: With Universal Orlando, Seaworld and Aquatica. Fodor's Travel Publications. ISBN 978-0307929228.
