= Grey =

Intermediate color between black and white

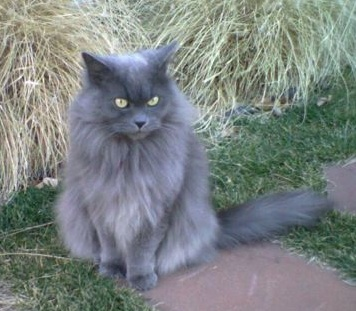
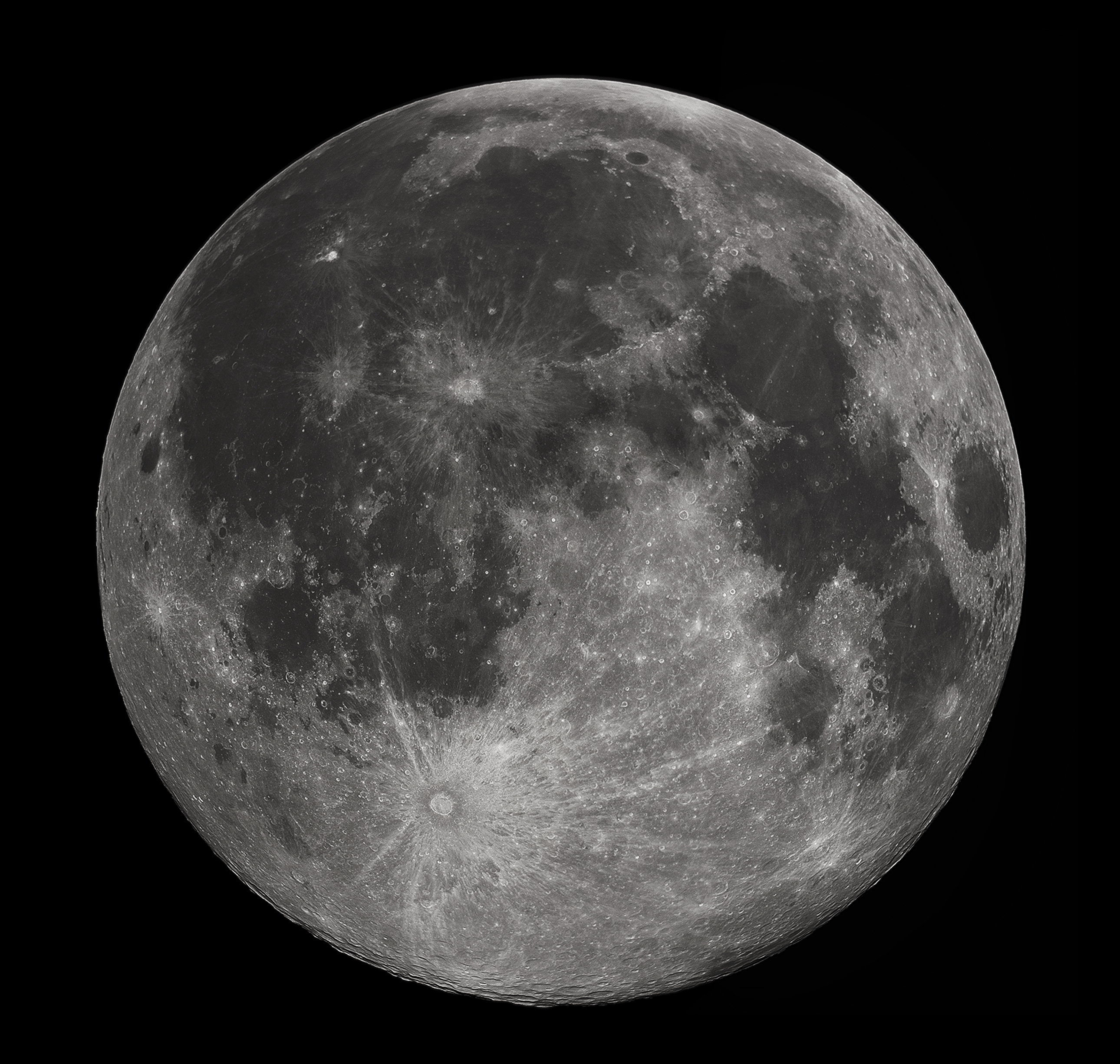
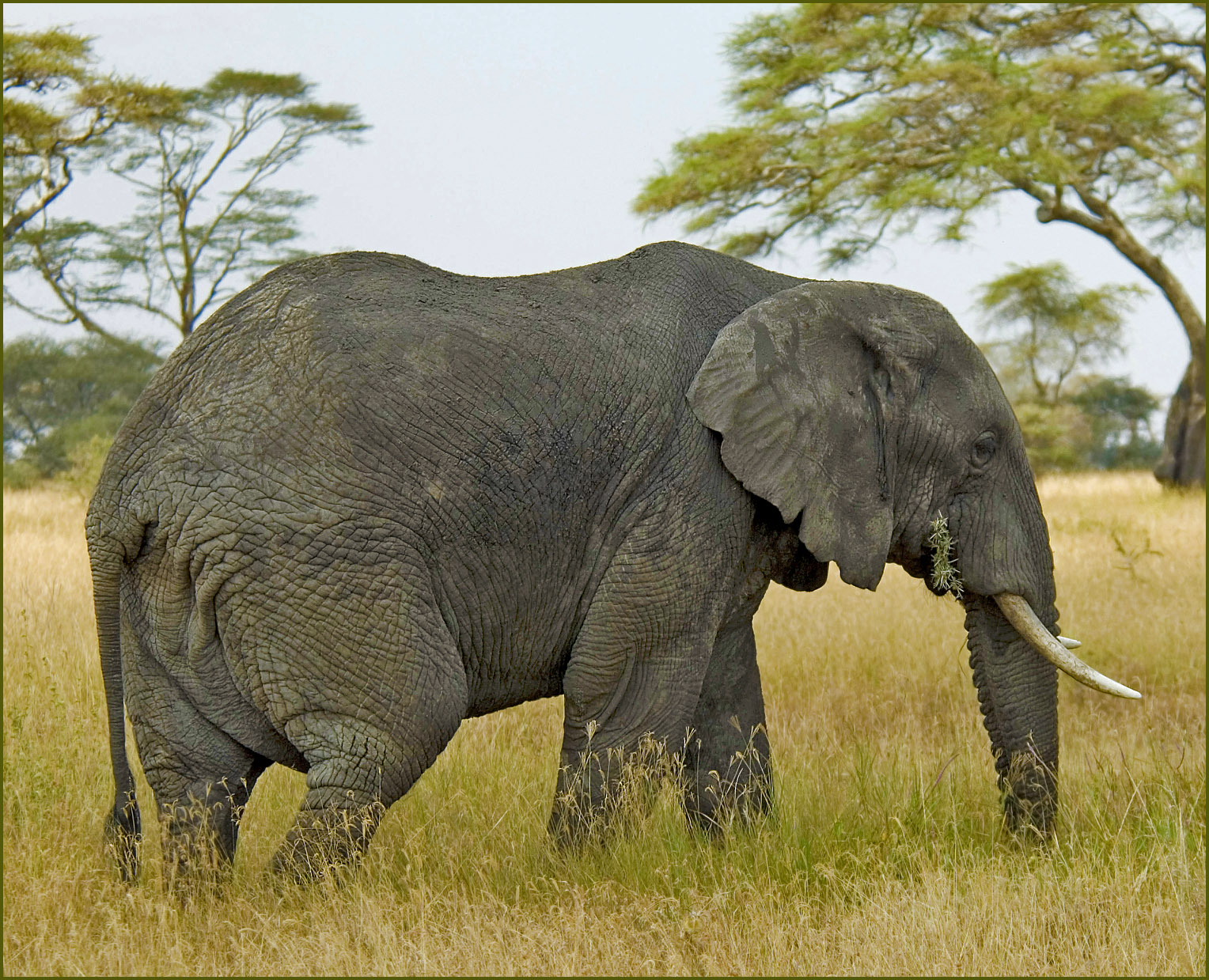
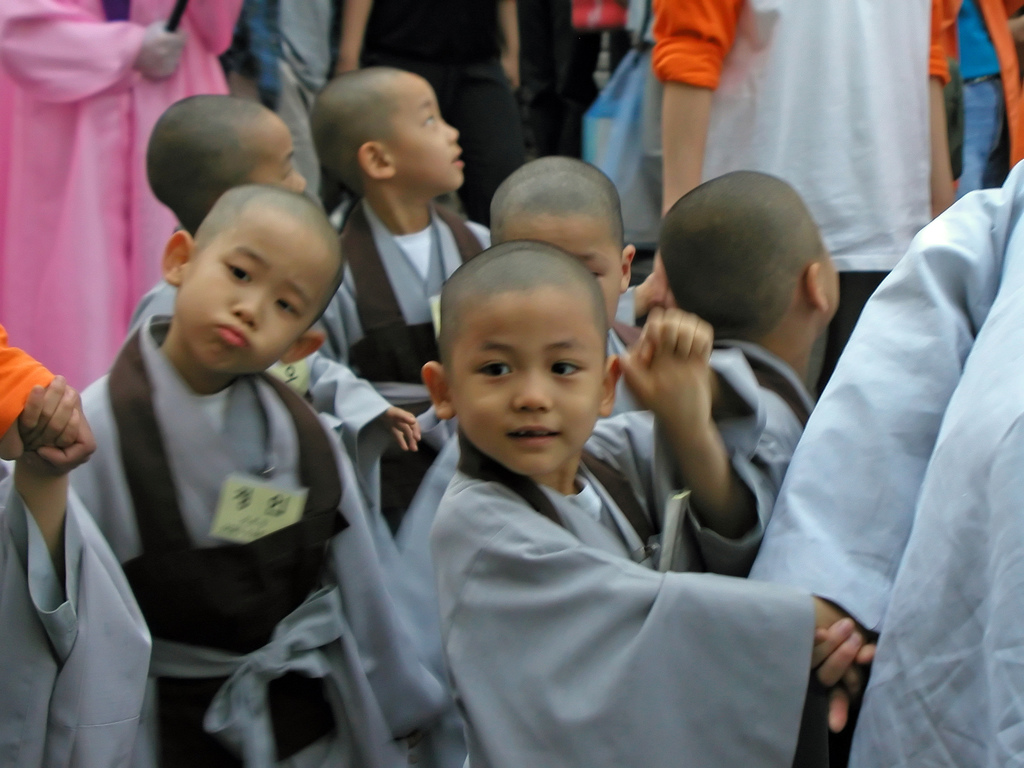
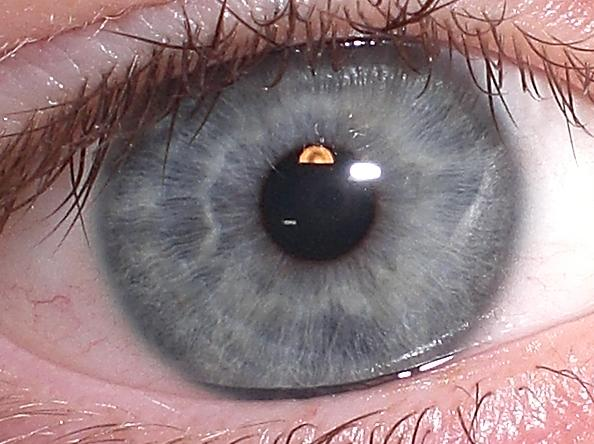
- Clockwise, from top left: A longhaired cat; Whistler's Mother by James McNeill Whistler; The Moon; an African bush elephant; Grey iris; Buddhist monks.

Color coordinates
- Hex triplet: #808080
- sRGB^{B} (r, g, b): (128, 128, 128)
- HSV (h, s, v): (0°, 0%, 50%)
- CIELCh_{uv} (L, C, h): (54, 0, 0°)
- Source: HTML/CSS
- B: Normalized to [0–255] (byte); H: Normalized to [0–100] (hundred)

Grey or gray is an intermediate color between black and white. It is a neutral or achromatic color, meaning that it has no chroma. It is the color of a rain or storm cloud, of ash, and of lead.

The first recorded use of grey as a color name in the English language was in 700 CE. Grey is the dominant spelling in European and Commonwealth English, while gray is more common in American English; however, both spellings are valid in both varieties of English.

In Europe and North America, surveys show that grey is the color most commonly associated with neutrality, conformity, boredom, uncertainty, old age, indifference, and humility. Only one percent of respondents chose it as their favorite color.

== Etymology ==
Grey comes from the Middle English grai or grei, from the Old English grǣġ, and is related to the Dutch grauw and German grau. There are certain cognates outside Germanic languages; terms such as Spanish gris, Italian grigio and Medieval Latin griseus are considered Germanic loanwords. The first recorded use of grey as a color name in the English language was in 700 CE.

The distinction between grey and gray spellings in usual Commonwealth and American English respectively developed c. the 20th century.

== In history and art ==
=== Antiquity through the Middle Ages ===
In antiquity and the Middle Ages, grey was the color of undyed wool, and thus was the color most commonly worn by peasants and the poor. It was also the color worn by Cistercian monks and friars of the Franciscan and Capuchin orders as a symbol of their vows of humility and poverty. Franciscan friars in England and Scotland were commonly known as the grey friars, and that name is now attached to many places in Great Britain.

=== Renaissance and the Baroque ===
During the Renaissance and the Baroque, grey began to play an important role in fashion and art. Black became the most popular color of the nobility, particularly in Italy, France, and Spain, and grey and white were harmonious with it.

Grey was also frequently used for the drawing of oil paintings, a technique called grisaille. The painting would first be composed in grey and white, and then the colors, made with thin transparent glazes, would be added on top. The grisaille beneath would provide the shading, visible through the layers of color. Sometimes, the grisaille was simply left uncovered, giving the appearance of carved stone.

Grey was a particularly good background color for gold and for skin tones. It became the most common background for the portraits of Rembrandt van Rijn and for many of the paintings of El Greco, who used it to highlight the faces and costumes of the central figures. The palette of Rembrandt was composed almost entirely of somber colors. He composed his warm greys out of black pigments made from charcoal or burnt animal bones, mixed with lead white or a white made of lime, which he warmed with a little red lake color from cochineal or madder. In one painting, the portrait of Margaretha de Geer (1661), one part of a grey wall in the background is painted with a layer of dark brown over a layer of orange, red, and yellow earths, mixed with ivory black and some lead white. Over this he put an additional layer of glaze made of mixture of blue smalt, red ochre, and yellow lake. Using these ingredients and many others, he made greys which had, according to art historian Philip Ball, "an incredible subtlety of pigmentation". The warm, dark and rich greys and browns served to emphasize the golden light on the faces in the paintings.

=== Eighteenth and nineteenth centuries ===
Grey became a highly fashionable color in the 18th century, both for women's dresses and for men's waistcoats and coats. It looked particularly luminous coloring the silk and satin fabrics worn by the nobility and wealthy.

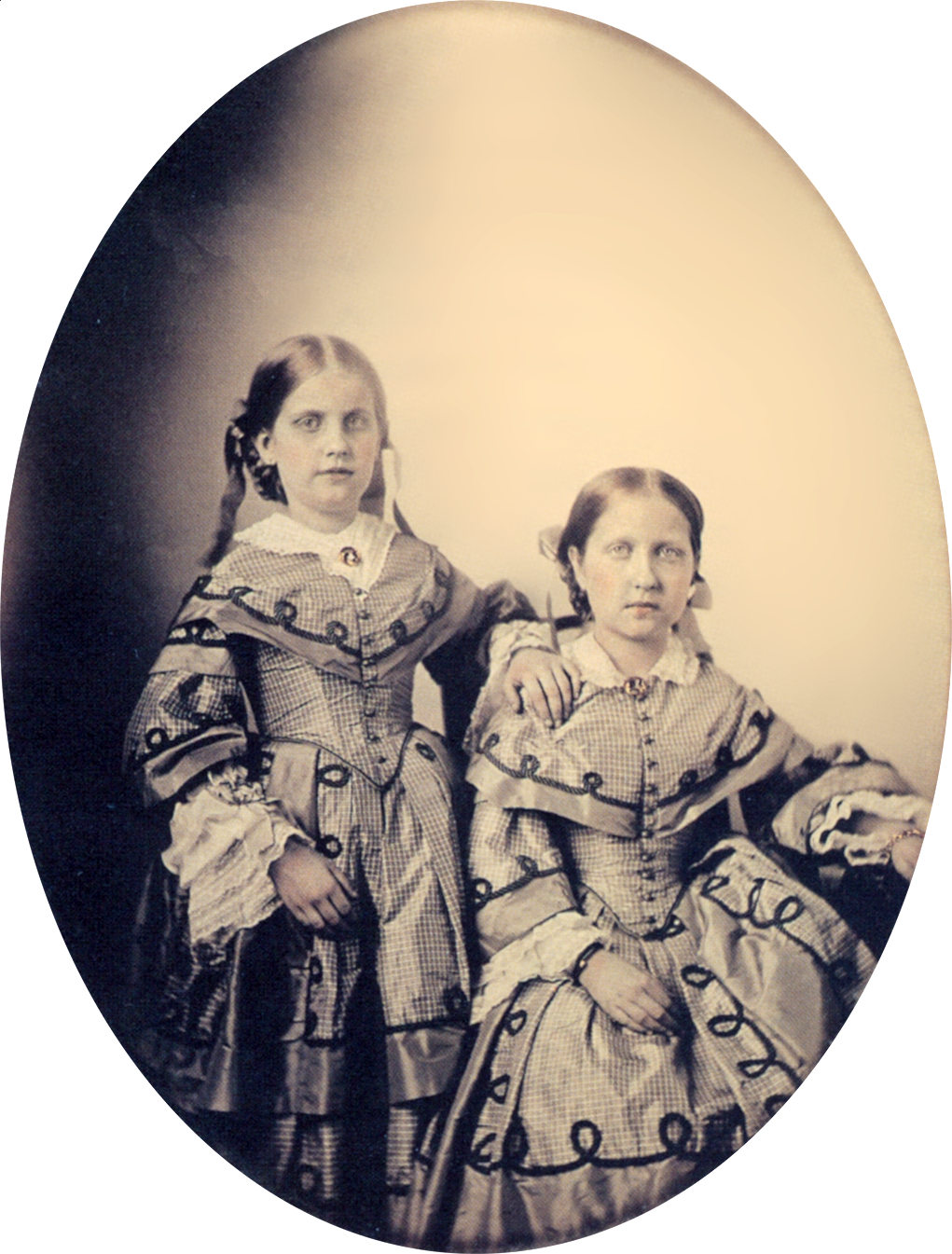
Brazilian princesses Leopoldina and Isabel (seated) wearing grey gowns, c. 1855

Women's fashion in the 19th century was dominated by Paris, while men's fashion was set by London. The grey business suit appeared in the mid-19th century in London; light grey in summer, dark grey in winter; replacing the more colorful palette of men's clothing early in the century.

The clothing of women working in the factories and workshops of Paris in the 19th century was usually grey. This gave them the name of grisettes. "Gris" or grey also meant drunk, and the name "grisette" was also given to the lower class of Parisian prostitutes.

Grey also became a common color for military uniforms; in an age of rifles with longer range, soldiers in grey were less visible as targets than those in blue or red. Grey was the color of the uniforms of the Confederate Army during the American Civil War, and of the Prussian Army for active service wear from 1910 onwards.

Several artists of the mid-19th century used tones of grey to create memorable paintings; Jean-Baptiste-Camille Corot used tones of green-grey and blue grey to give harmony to his landscapes, and James McNeill Whistler created a special grey for the background of the portrait of his mother, and for his own self-portrait.

Whistler's arrangement of tones of grey had an effect on the world of music, on the French composer Claude Debussy. In 1894, Debussy wrote to violinist Eugène Ysaÿe describing his Nocturnes as "an experiment in the combinations that can be obtained from one colour – what a study in grey would be in painting".

=== Twentieth and twenty-first centuries ===
In the late 1930s, grey became a symbol of industrialization and war. It was the dominant color of Pablo Picasso's celebrated painting about the horrors of the Spanish Civil War, Guernica.

After the war, the grey business suit became a metaphor for uniformity of thought, popularized in such books as The Man in the Gray Flannel Suit (1955), which became a successful film in 1956.

== In the sciences, nature, and technology ==
=== Storm clouds ===
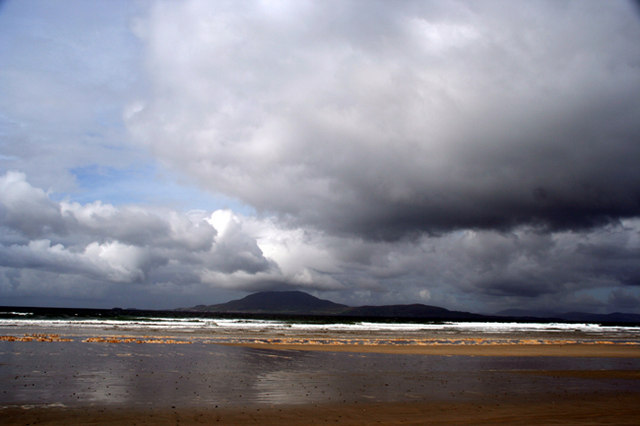
Storm clouds towards Clare Island, Ireland

The whiteness or darkness of clouds is a function of their depth. Small, fluffy white clouds in summer look white because the sunlight is being scattered by the tiny water droplets they contain, and that white light comes to the viewer's eye. However, as clouds become larger and thicker, the white light cannot penetrate through the cloud, and is reflected off the top. Clouds look darkest grey during thunderstorms, when they can be as much as 20,000 to 30,000 feet high.

Stratiform clouds are a layer of clouds that covers the entire sky, and which have a depth of between a few hundred to a few thousand feet thick. The thicker the clouds, the darker they appear from below, because little of the sunlight is able to pass through. From above, in an airplane, the same clouds look perfectly white, but from the ground the sky looks gloomy and grey.

=== The greying of hair ===
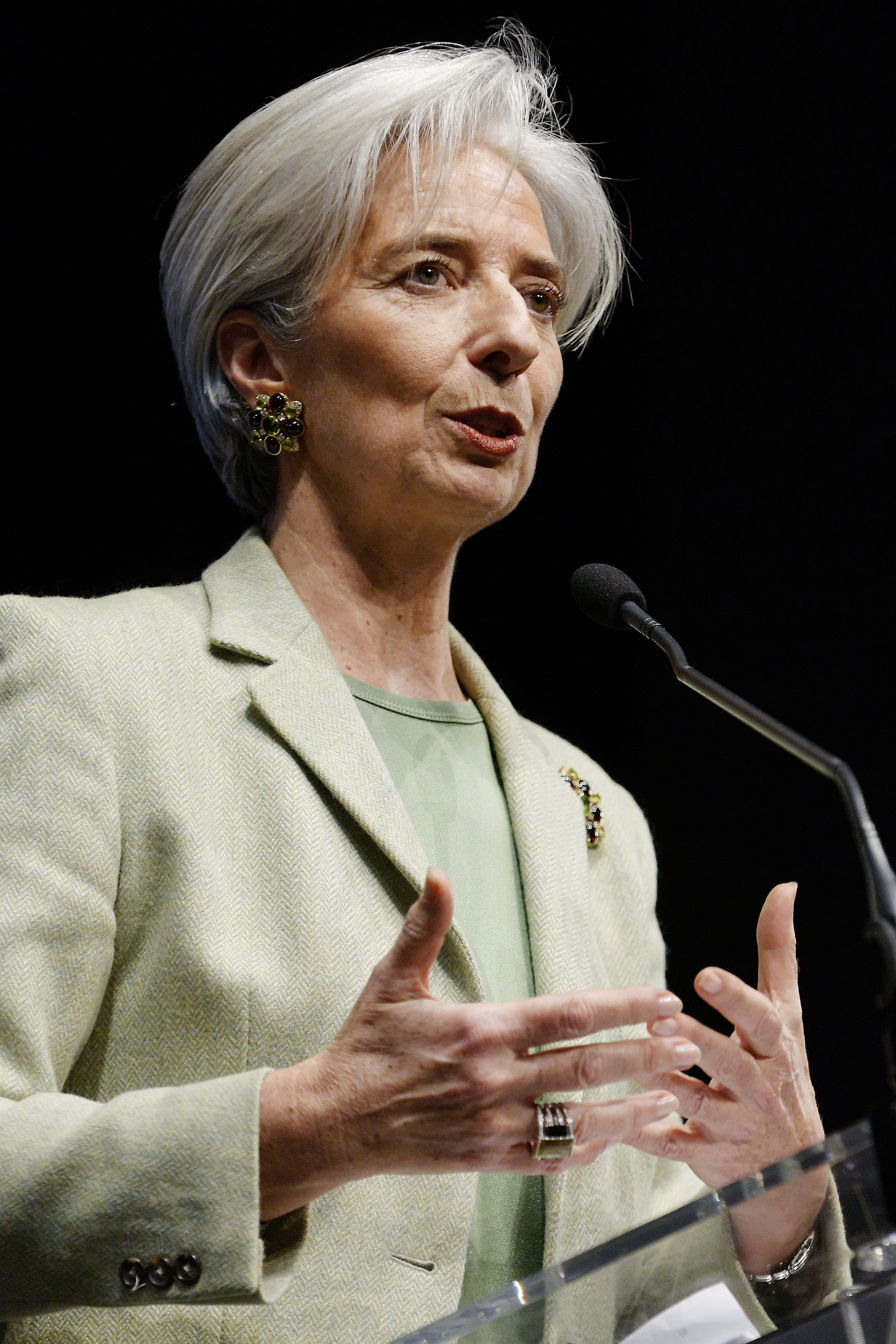
French politician Christine Lagarde

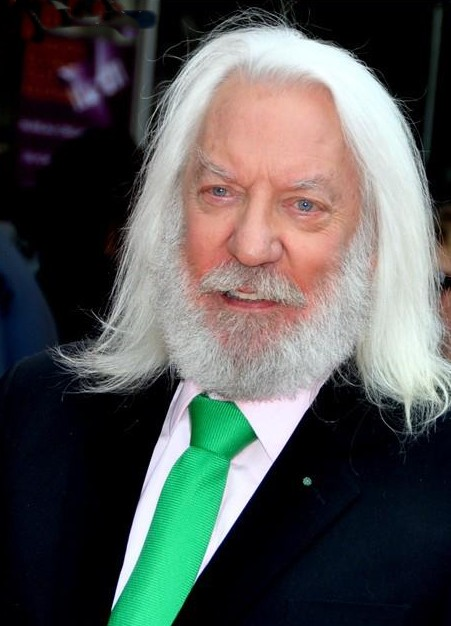
Canadian actor Donald Sutherland

The color of a person's hair is created by the pigment melanin, found in the core of each hair. Melanin is also responsible for the color of the skin and of the eyes. There are only two types of pigment: dark (eumelanin) or light (phaeomelanin). Combined in various combinations, these pigments create all natural hair colors.

Melanin itself is the product of a specialized cell, the melanocyte, which is found in each hair follicle, from which the hair grows. As hair grows, the melanocyte injects melanin into the hair cells, which contain the protein keratin and which makes up our hair, skin, and nails. As long as the melanocytes continue injecting melanin into the hair cells, the hair retains its original color. At a certain age, however, which varies from person to person, the amount of melanin injected is reduced and eventually stops. The hair, without pigment, turns grey and eventually white. The reason for this decline of production of melanocytes is uncertain. In the February 2005 issue of Science, a team of Harvard scientists suggested that the cause was the failure of the melanocyte stem cells to maintain the production of the essential pigments, due to age or genetic factors, after a certain period of time. For some people, the breakdown comes in their twenties; for others, many years later. According to the site of the magazine Scientific American, "Generally speaking, among Caucasians 50 percent are 50 percent grey by age 50." Adult male gorillas also develop silver hair, but only on their backs – see Physical characteristics of gorillas.

=== Optics ===
Over the centuries, artists have traditionally created grey by mixing black and white in various proportions. They added a little red to make a warmer grey, or a little blue for a cooler grey. Artists could also make a grey by mixing two complementary colors, such as orange and azure.

Today the grey on televisions, computer displays, and telephones is usually created using the RGB color model. Red, green, and blue light combined at full intensity on the black screen makes white; by lowering the intensity, it is possible to create all the different shades of grey.

In printing, grey is usually obtained with the CMYK color model. By using black ink at a lower density than the one needed to print black, all the shades of grey can be created. Grey can also be formed by mixing cyan, magenta, and yellow in a specific proportion, each at a low or moderate density. Usually, both methods are combined.

Most greys have a cool or a warm cast to them, as the human eye can detect even a minute amount of color saturation. Adding a small amount of yellow, orange, or red will create a "warm grey". Adding a small amount of green, cyan, blue, or violet will form a "cool grey". When no color is added, the color is "neutral grey", "achromatic grey", or simply "grey". Images consisting wholly of black, white and greys are called monochrome, black-and-white, or greyscale.

Warm grey	Cool grey
Mixed with yellow	Mixed with blue

RGB model
Grey values result when R = G = B, for the color (R, G, B) (0 < R, G, B < 1).
CMYK model
Grey values are produced by C = M = Y = 0; 0 < K < 1, for the color (C, M, Y, K). Lightness is adjusted by varying K. In theory, any mixture where C = M = Y is neutral, but in practice such mixtures are often a muddy brown.
HSL and HSV models
Achromatic greys have no saturation, so grey is produced by S = 0; 0 < (L or V) < 1; (hue (H) is undefined), for the color (H, S, L) or (H, S, V).

HTML color Name	Sample		Hex triplet
	(rendered by name)	(rendered by hex triplet)
gainsboro			#DCDCDC
lightgray			#D3D3D3
silver			#C0C0C0
darkgray			#A9A9A9
grey			#808080
dimgray			#696969
lightslategray			#778899
slategray			#708090
darkslategray			#2F4F4F

=== Web colors ===
There are several tones of grey available for use with HTML and Cascading Style Sheets (CSS) as named colors, while 254 true greys are available by specification of a hex triplet for the RGB value. All are spelled gray, using the spelling grey can cause errors. This spelling was inherited from the X11 color list. Internet Explorer's Trident browser engine does not recognize grey and renders it green. Another anomaly is that gray is in fact much darker than the X11 color marked darkgray; this is because of a conflict with the original HTML grey and the X11 grey, which is closer to HTML's silver. The three slategray colors are not themselves on the greyscale, but are slightly saturated toward cyan (green + blue). Since there are an even (256, including black and white) number of unsaturated tones of grey, there are two grey tones straddling the midpoint in the 8-bit greyscale. The color name gray has been assigned the lighter of the two shades (128, also known as #808080), due to rounding up.

=== Pigments ===
Until the 19th century, artists traditionally created grey by simply combining black and white. Rembrandt Van Rijn, for instance, usually used lead white and either carbon black or ivory black, along with touches of either blues or reds to cool or warm the grey.

In the early 19th century, a new grey, Payne's grey, appeared on the market. Payne's grey is a dark blue-grey, a mixture of ultramarine and black or of ultramarine and sienna. It is named after William Payne, a British artist who painted watercolors in the late 18th century. The first recorded use of Payne's grey as a color name in English was in 1835.

=== Animal color ===
Grey is a very common color for animals, birds, and fish, ranging in size from whales to mice. It provides a natural camouflage and allows them to blend with their surroundings.

=== Grey matter of the brain ===
The substance that composes the brain is sometimes referred to as grey matter, or "the little grey cells", so the color grey is associated with things intellectual. However, the living human brain is actually pink in color; it only turns grey when dead.

=== Nanotechnology and grey goo ===
Grey goo is a hypothetical end-of-the-world scenario, also known as ecophagy: out-of-control self-replicating nanobots consume all living matter on Earth while building more of themselves.

=== Grey noise ===
In sound engineering, grey noise is random noise subjected to an equal-loudness contour, such as an inverted A-weighting curve, over a given range of frequencies, giving the listener the perception that it is equally loud at all frequencies.

== In culture ==
=== Religion ===
In the Christian religion, grey is the color of ashes, and so a biblical symbol of mourning and repentance, described as sackcloth and ashes. It can be used during Lent or on special days of fasting and prayer. As the color of humility and modesty, grey is worn by friars of the Order of Friars Minor Capuchin and Franciscan order as well as monks of the Cistercian order. Grey cassocks are worn by clergy of the Brazilian Catholic Apostolic Church.

Buddhist monks and priests in Japan and Korea will often wear a sleeved grey, brown, or black outer robe.

Taoist priests in China also often wear grey.

=== Politics ===
Grey is rarely used as a color by political parties, largely because of its common association with conformity, boredom and indecision. An example of a political party using grey as a color are the German Grey Panthers.

The term "grey power" or "the grey vote" is sometimes used to describe the influence of older voters as a voting bloc. In the United States, older people are more likely to vote, and usually vote to protect certain social benefits, such as Social Security.

Greys is a term sometimes used pejoratively by environmentalists in the green movement to describe those who oppose environmental measures and supposedly prefer the grey of concrete and cement.

=== Military ===
During the American Civil War, the soldiers of the Confederate Army wore grey uniforms. At the beginning of the war, the armies of the North and of the South had very similar uniforms; some Confederate units wore blue, and some Union units wore grey. There was confusion, and sometimes soldiers fired by mistake at soldiers of their own army. On June 6, 1861, the Confederate government issued regulations standardizing the army uniform and establishing cadet grey as the uniform color. This was (and still is) the color of the uniform of cadets at the United States Military Academy at West Point, and cadets at the Virginia Military Institute, which produced many officers for the Confederacy.

The new uniforms were designed by Nicola Marschall, a German-American artist, who also designed the original Confederate flag. He closely followed the design of contemporary French and Austrian military uniforms. Grey was not chosen for its camouflage value; this benefit was not appreciated for several more decades. The South lacked a major dye industry, though, and grey dyes were inexpensive and easy to manufacture. While some units had uniforms colored with good-quality dyes, which were a solid bluish-grey, others had uniforms colored with vegetable dyes made from sumac or logwood, which quickly faded in sunshine to the yellowish color of butternut squash.

The German Army wore grey uniforms from 1907 until 1945, during both the First World War and Second World War. The color chosen was a grey-green called field grey (German: feldgrau). It was chosen because it was less visible at a distance than the previous German uniforms, which were Prussian blue. It was one of the first uniform colors to be chosen for its camouflage value, important in the new age of smokeless powder and more accurate rifles and machine guns. It gave the Germans a distinct advantage at the beginning of the First World War, when the French soldiers were dressed in blue jackets and red trousers. The Finnish Army also began using grey uniforms on the German model.

Some of the more recent uniforms of the German Army and East German Army were field grey, as were some uniforms of the Swedish army. The formal dress (M/83) of the Finnish Army is grey. The Army of Chile wears field grey today.

=== The grey suit ===
During the 19th century, women's fashions were largely dictated by Paris, while London set fashions for men. The intent of a business suit was above all to show seriousness, and to show one's position in business and society. Over the course of the century, bright colors disappeared from men's fashion, and were largely replaced by a black or dark charcoal grey frock coat in winter, and lighter greys in summer. In the early 20th century, the frock coat was gradually replaced by the lounge suit, a less formal version of evening dress, which was also usually black or charcoal grey. In the 1930s the English suit style was called the drape suit, with wide shoulders and a nipped waist, usually dark or light grey. After World War II, the style changed to a slimmer fit called the continental cut, but the color remained grey.

=== Sports ===
- In baseball, grey is the color typically used for road uniforms. This came about because in the 19th and early 20th century, away teams did not normally have access to laundry facilities on the road, thus stains were not noticeable on the darker grey uniforms as opposed to the white uniforms worn by the home team.
- The Vegas Golden Knights of the National Hockey League features steel grey as one of its primary colors and its current alternate uniforms are steel grey.
- New Caledonia national football teams have worn grey home shirts and the color is featured on its football badge.
- Georgetown University's athletics teams feature grey as a primary color. Its basketball team traditionally wears the color at home.

=== Gay culture ===
In gay slang, a grey queen is a gay person who works for the financial services industry. This term originates from the fact that in the 1950s, people who worked in this profession often wore grey flannel suits.

== Associations and symbolism ==
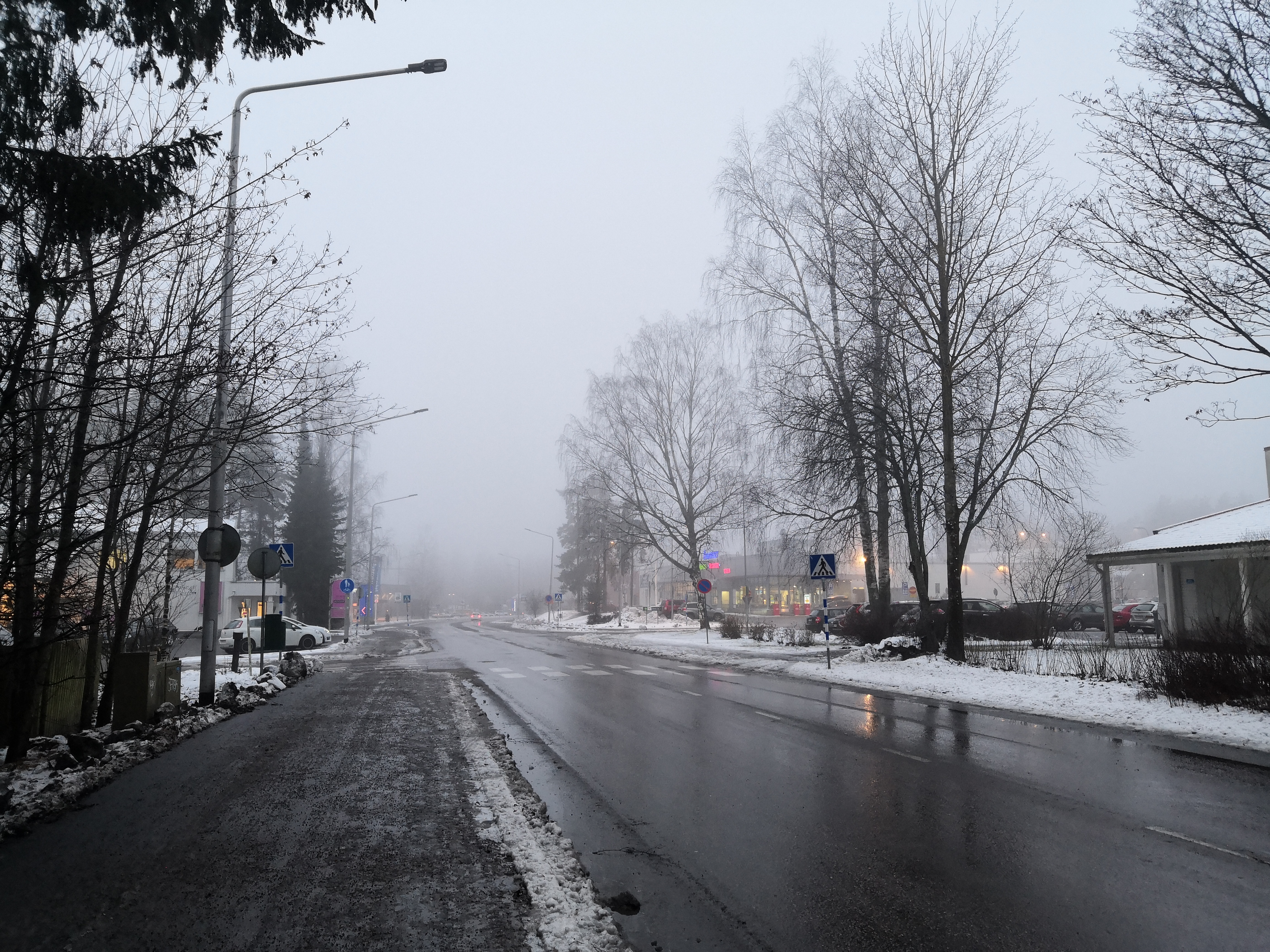
The city of Kouvola, mostly known for its greyscale environment, in Kymenlaakso, Finland

In America and Europe, grey is one of the least popular colors; In a European survey, only one percent of men said it was their favorite color, and thirteen percent called it their least favorite color; the response from women was almost the same. According to one author, "grey is too weak to be considered masculine, but too menacing to be considered a feminine color. It is neither warm nor cold, neither material or spiritual. With grey, nothing seems to be decided." It also denotes undefinedness and ambiguity, as in a grey area.

Grey is the color most commonly associated in many cultures with the elderly and old age, because of the association with grey hair; it symbolizes the wisdom and dignity that come with experience and age. The New York Times is sometimes called The Grey Lady because of its long history and esteemed position in American journalism.

Grey is the color most often associated in Europe and America with modesty.

== See also ==
- The dictionary definition of grey at Wiktionary
- Shades of grey
- Black
- Black and white
- Eigengrau
- Lists of colors
- Vin gris (grey wine in French)
- White

== Bibliography ==
- Heller, Eva (2009). Psychologie de la couleur – Effets et symboliques. Pyramyd (French translation). ISBN 978-2-35017-156-2.
- Zuffi, Stefano (2012). Color in Art. Abrams. ISBN 978-1-4197-0111-5.
- Gage, John (2009). La Couleur dans l'art. Thames & Hudson. ISBN 978-2-87811-325-9.
- Gottsegen, Mark (2006). The Painter's Handbook: A Complete Reference. New York: Watson-Guptill Publications. ISBN 0-8230-3496-8.
- Varichon, Anne (2000). Couleurs - pigments et teintures dans les mains des peuples. Paris: Editions du Seuil. ISBN 978-2-02-084697-4.
