= Ambiguity (disambiguation) =

Ambiguity is uncertainty as to intended meaning. It is the quality of being open to more than one interpretation; inexactness.

Ambiguity may also refer to:

- Ambiguity (album)
- Ambiguity (horse), 20th-century racer
- Ambiguity (law), contract law situation
- Ambiguous name, botanical taxonomy situation

== See also ==
- Ambiguity aversion, decision theory concept
- Volatility, uncertainty, complexity and ambiguity
- Word-sense disambiguation
- Disambiguation (disambiguation)
