= Shades of gray =

Variations of the color gray

Gray/Grey

Common connotations
- pessimism, depression, boredom, neutrality, undefinedness, old age, contentment and elegance

Color coordinates
- Hex triplet: #808080
- sRGB^{B} (r, g, b): (128, 128, 128)
- HSV (h, s, v): (0°, 0%, 50%)
- CIELCh_{uv} (L, C, h): (54, 0, 0°)
- Source: HTML/CSS
- B: Normalized to [0–255] (byte)

Variations of gray or grey include achromatic grayscale shades, which lie exactly between white and black, and nearby colors with low colorfulness. A selection of a number of these various colors is shown below.

== Chart of computer web color grays ==
Below is a chart showing the computer web color grays. An achromatic gray is a gray color in which the values for the red, green and blue components are exactly equal. A chromatic gray is a color in which one or more of the ratios between red, green and blue is unequal, but only slightly, which is what makes it a shade of gray. Among the web colors, gray, light gray, dark gray, dim gray and gainsboro are all achromatic or "neutral" grays, whereas slate gray, light slate gray and dark slate gray are chromatic. When the imbalance of the three color ratios in a chromatic gray favors green or blue it is called a "cool" gray, and when it favors red it is called a "warm" gray; all of the web colors' chromatic grays are of the "cool" variety.

HTML color name	Sample		Hex triplet
HTML color name	By name	By hex triplet	Hex triplet
gainsboro			#dcdcdc
lightgray			#d3d3d3
silver			#c0c0c0
darkgray			#a9a9a9
gray			#808080
lightslategray			#778899
slategray			#708090
dimgray			#696969
darkslategray			#2f4f4f

== White and black ==
The colors white and black are not usually thought of as shades of gray, but they can be thought of as shades of achromatic gray, as both contain equal amounts of red, blue and green. White is at the extreme upper end of the achromatic value scale and black is at the extreme lower end of the achromatic value scale, with all the colors normally considered tones of achromatic gray colors in between. Since achromatic colors have no hue, the hue code (h code) is left blank for achromatic colors (usually marked as a dash).

=== White ===
White

Color coordinates
- Hex triplet: #FFFFFF
- sRGB^{B} (r, g, b): (255, 255, 255)
- HSV (h, s, v): (0°, 0%, 100%)
- CIELCh_{uv} (L, C, h): (100, 0, 0°)
- Source: By definition
- B: Normalized to [0–255] (byte)

White is a color, the perception of which is evoked by light that stimulates all three types of color sensitive cone cells in the human eye in equal amounts and with high brightness compared to the surroundings. A white visual stimulation will be void of hue and grayness. White is the lightest possible color.

== Achromatic grays ==
Achromatic grays are colors in which the RGB (red, green, and blue) values are exactly equal. Since achromatic grays have no hue, the hue code (the h in the hsv values of the color) is indicated with a dash. Achromatic grays are the axis of the color sphere, with white at the north pole and black at the south pole of the color sphere. The various tones of achromatic gray are along the axis of the color sphere from white at the top of the axis to black at the bottom of the axis.

=== Gray ===
Gray/Grey

Color coordinates
- Hex triplet: #808080
- sRGB^{B} (r, g, b): (128, 128, 128)
- HSV (h, s, v): (0°, 0%, 50%)
- CIELCh_{uv} (L, C, h): (54, 0, 0°)
- Source: HTML/CSS
- ISCC–NBS descriptor: Medium gray
- B: Normalized to [0–255] (byte)

At right is displayed the color gray.

The first recorded use of gray as a color name in the English language was in 700.

This tone of gray (HTML gray) is universally used as the standard for gray because it is that tone of gray which is halfway between white and black.

=== Gainsboro ===
Gainsboro

Color coordinates
- Hex triplet: #DCDCDC
- sRGB^{B} (r, g, b): (220, 220, 220)
- HSV (h, s, v): (0°, 0%, 86%)
- CIELCh_{uv} (L, C, h): (88, 0, 0°)
- Source: X11
- ISCC–NBS descriptor: Greenish gray
- B: Normalized to [0–255] (byte)

At right is displayed the web color Gainsboro

Gainsboro is a pale tone of gray named after British painter Thomas Gainsborough.

Prior to standardization as a web color, Gainsboro was included as one of the X11 color names. It was, however, absent from the original 1987 version of the list, but present in Paul Raveling's version which added, amongst other things, "[l]ight and off-white colors, copied from several Sinclair Paints color samples".

=== Silver ===
Silver
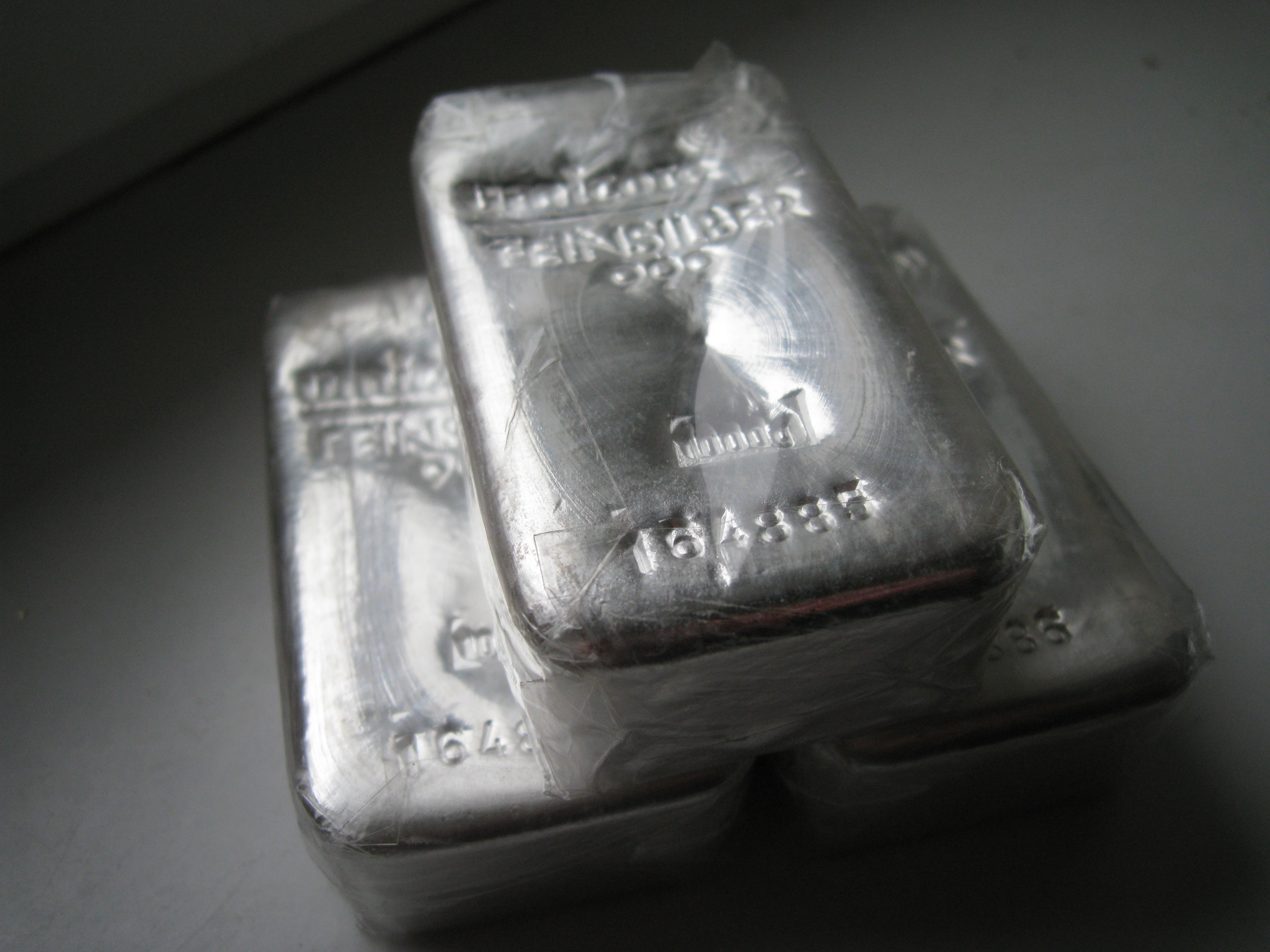
- Silver ingots

Color coordinates
- Hex triplet: #C0C0C0
- sRGB^{B} (r, g, b): (192, 192, 192)
- HSV (h, s, v): (0°, 0%, 75%)
- CIELCh_{uv} (L, C, h): (78, 0, 0°)
- Source: HTML/CSS
- ISCC–NBS descriptor: Light gray
- B: Normalized to [0–255] (byte)

Displayed at right is the web color silver

This color is a representation of the color of the metal silver.

This is supposed to be a metallic color; however, there is no mechanism for displaying metallic colors on a flat computer screen.

=== Medium gray ===
Medium gray

Color coordinates
- Hex triplet: #BEBEBE
- sRGB^{B} (r, g, b): (190, 190, 190)
- HSV (h, s, v): (0°, 0%, 75%)
- CIELCh_{uv} (L, C, h): (77, 0, 0°)
- Source: X11
- ISCC–NBS descriptor: Light gray
- B: Normalized to [0–255] (byte)

At right is displayed the color medium gray, or gray in the X11 color names, which is lighter than the HTML/CSS gray shown below. The coordinates in the X11 were set at 190 to avoid gray being displayed as white on 2-bit grayscale displays.

See the chart Color names that clash between X11 and HTML/CSS in the X11 color names article to see those colors which are different in HTML/CSS and X11.

=== Spanish gray ===
Spanish gray

Color coordinates
- Hex triplet: #989898
- sRGB^{B} (r, g, b): (152, 152, 152)
- HSV (h, s, v): (0°, 0%, 60%)
- CIELCh_{uv} (L, C, h): (63, 0, 0°)
- Source: Gallego and Sanz
- ISCC–NBS descriptor: Medium gray
- B: Normalized to [0–255] (byte)

Spanish gray is the color that is called gris (gray in Spanish) in the Guía de coloraciones (Guide to colorations) by Rosa Gallego and Juan Carlos Sanz, a color dictionary published in 2005 that is widely popular in the Hispanophone realm.

=== Davy's gray ===
Davy's gray

Color coordinates
- Hex triplet: #555555
- sRGB^{B} (r, g, b): (85, 85, 85)
- HSV (h, s, v): (0°, 0%, 33%)
- CIELCh_{uv} (L, C, h): (36, 0, 0°)
- Source: ISCC-NBS
- ISCC–NBS descriptor: Dark gray
- B: Normalized to [0–255] (byte)

Davy's gray is a dark gray color, made from powdered slate, iron oxide and carbon black named for Henry Davy.

=== Tundora ===
Tundora

Color coordinates
- Hex triplet: #404040
- sRGB^{B} (r, g, b): (64, 64, 64)
- HSV (h, s, v): (0°, 0%, 25%)
- CIELCh_{uv} (L, C, h): (27, 0, 0°)
- Source: The Color API
- B: Normalized to [0–255] (byte)

Tundora refers to a dark shade of gray which lies between gray and black.

== Off-grays ==
Off-grays are colors that are very close to achromatic grays, but whose red, green, and blue color codes are not exactly equal.

=== Ash gray ===
Ash gray
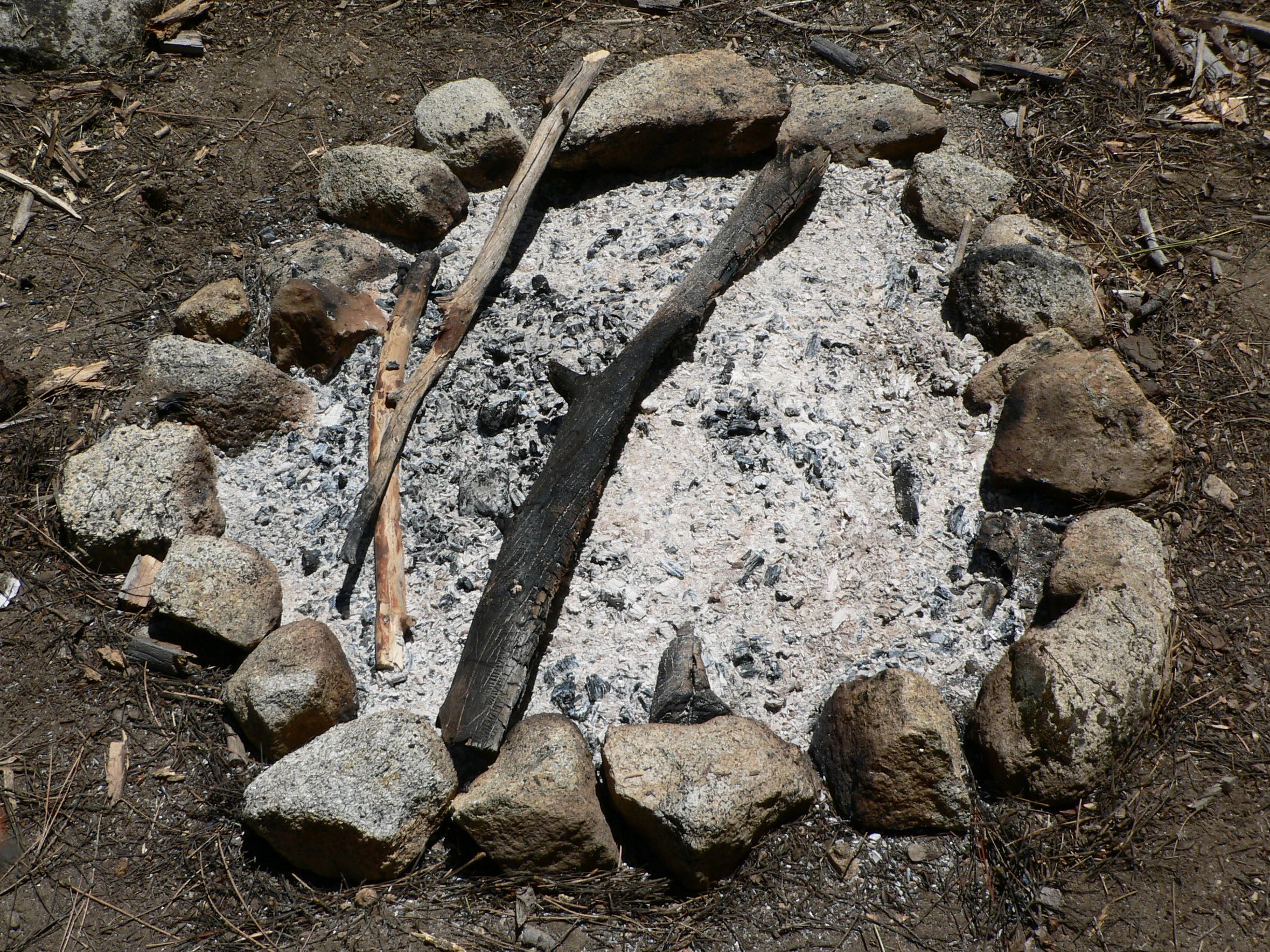
- Wood ash from a campfire

Color coordinates
- Hex triplet: #B2BEB5
- sRGB^{B} (r, g, b): (178, 190, 181)
- HSV (h, s, v): (135°, 6%, 75%)
- CIELCh_{uv} (L, C, h): (76, 8, 138°)
- Source: ISCC-NBS
- ISCC–NBS descriptor: Pale green
- B: Normalized to [0–255] (byte)

Displayed in the adjacent image is the color ash gray.

The color ash gray is a representation of the color of ash; also known (from its name in Latin language) as cinereous.

The first recorded use of ash gray as a color name in English was in 1374.

=== Battleship gray ===
Battleship gray
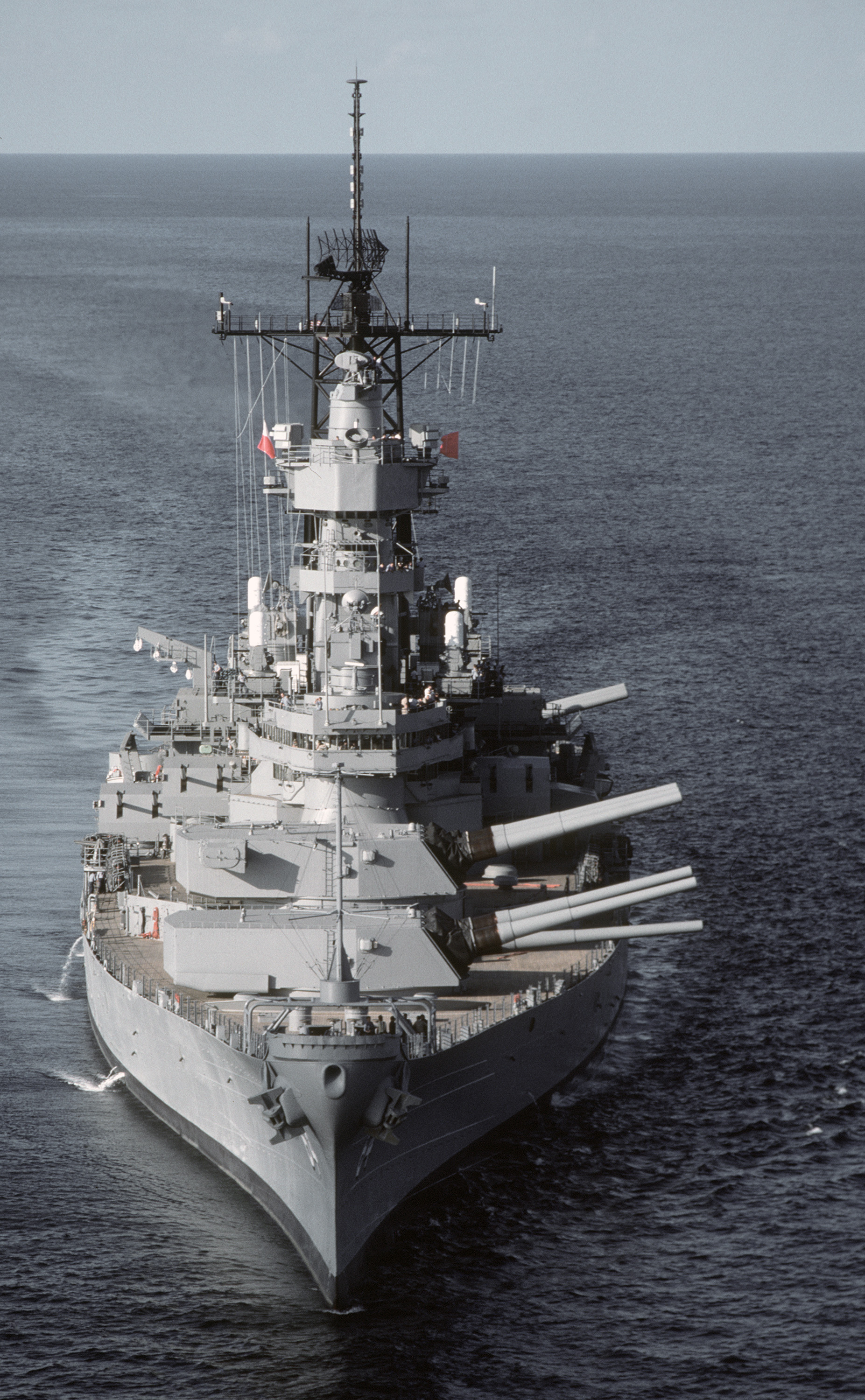
- The battleship USS Wisconsin

Color coordinates
- Hex triplet: #848482
- sRGB^{B} (r, g, b): (132, 132, 130)
- HSV (h, s, v): (60°, 2%, 52%)
- CIELCh_{uv} (L, C, h): (55, 2, 86°)
- Source: ISCC-NBS
- ISCC–NBS descriptor: Medium gray
- B: Normalized to [0–255] (byte)

The color battleship gray is displayed in the adjacent image. It is so called because the color is the shade of gray from the specular micaceous hematite paint used for rustproofing iron and steel battleships.

The normalized color coordinates for battleship gray are identical to old silver, first recorded as a color name in English in 1905.

=== Charcoal ===
Charcoal
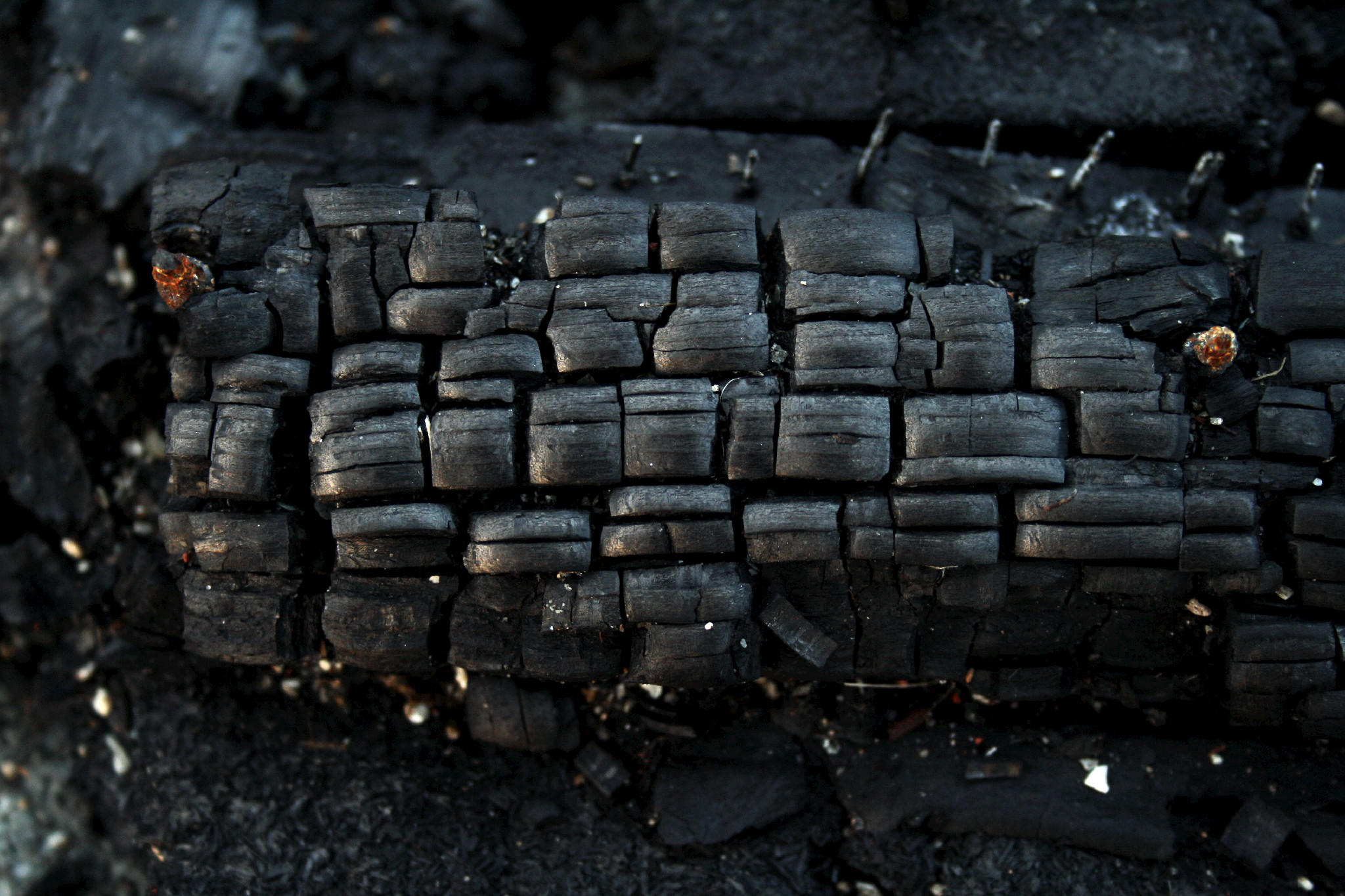
- Charcoal

Color coordinates
- Hex triplet: #36454F
- sRGB^{B} (r, g, b): (54, 69, 79)
- HSV (h, s, v): (204°, 32%, 31%)
- CIELCh_{uv} (L, C, h): (28, 12, 231°)
- Source: ISCC-NBS
- ISCC–NBS descriptor: Dark grayish blue
- B: Normalized to [0–255] (byte)

Charcoal is a color that is a representation of the dark gray color of burned wood.

The first recorded use of charcoal as a color name in English was in 1606.

=== French gray ===
French gray

Color coordinates
- Hex triplet: #BEBFC5
- sRGB^{B} (r, g, b): (190, 191, 197)
- HSV (h, s, v): (231°, 4%, 77%)
- CIELCh_{uv} (L, C, h): (77, 5, 260°)
- Source: HTML/CSS
- ISCC–NBS descriptor: Light bluish gray
- B: Normalized to [0–255] (byte)

French gray is an off-gray color that traditionally has a slightly cooler, more blue tone than simple gray.

=== Gunmetal ===
Gunmetal

Color coordinates
- Hex triplet: #2A3439
- sRGB^{B} (r, g, b): (42, 52, 57)
- HSV (h, s, v): (200°, 26%, 22%)
- CIELCh_{uv} (L, C, h): (21, 6, 224°)
- Source: Encycolorpedia
- ISCC–NBS descriptor: Blackish green
- B: Normalized to [0–255] (byte)

Gunmetal, also called gunmetal gray, is a shade of gray that has a bluish purple tinge. It describes the color of several metals used in industrial applications, such as tarnished gunmetal, or parkerized steel.

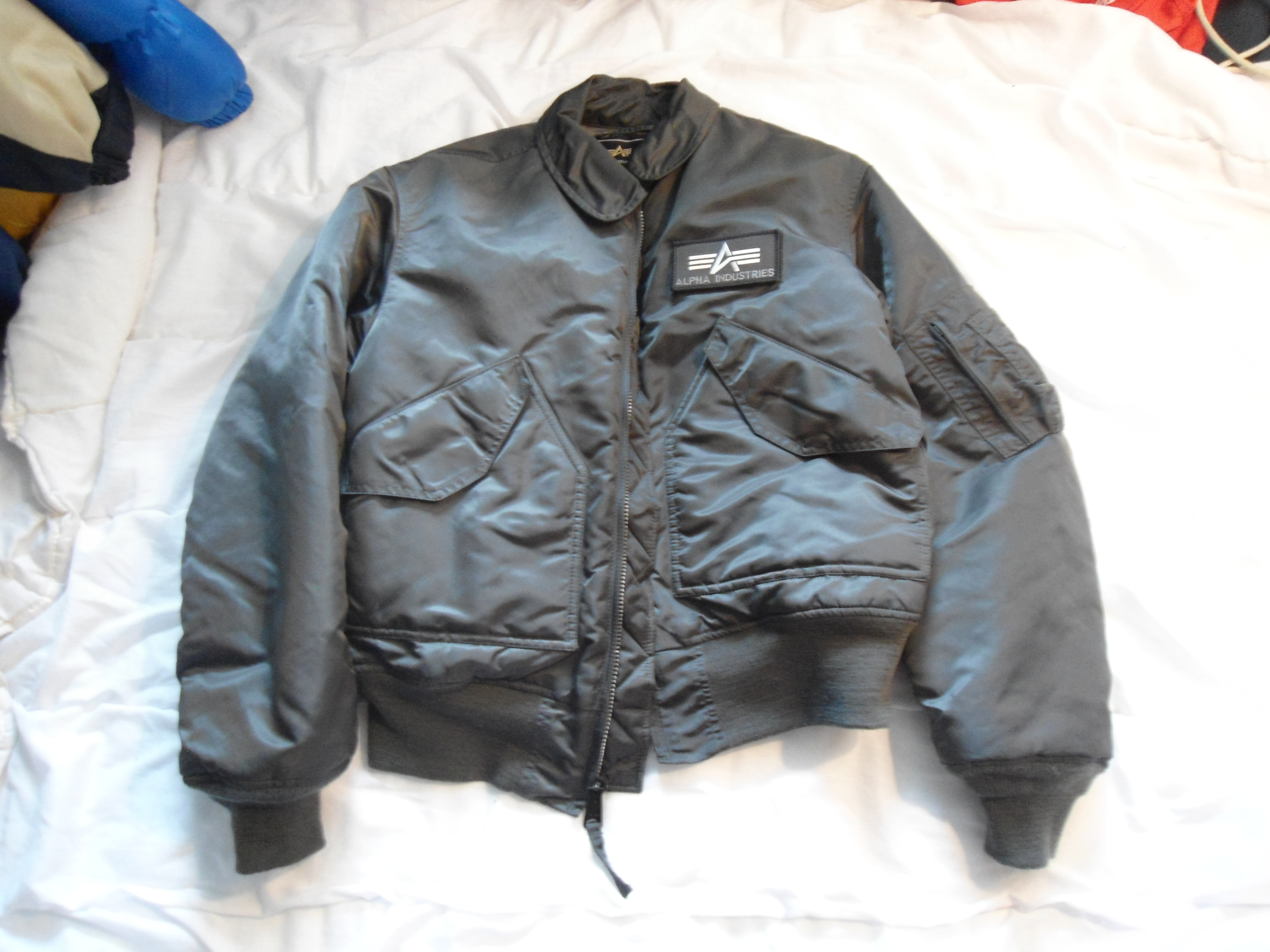
Alpha Industries ® CWU-Bomberjacket CWU 45(N) in gunmetal gray

=== Lead gray ===
Lead Gray
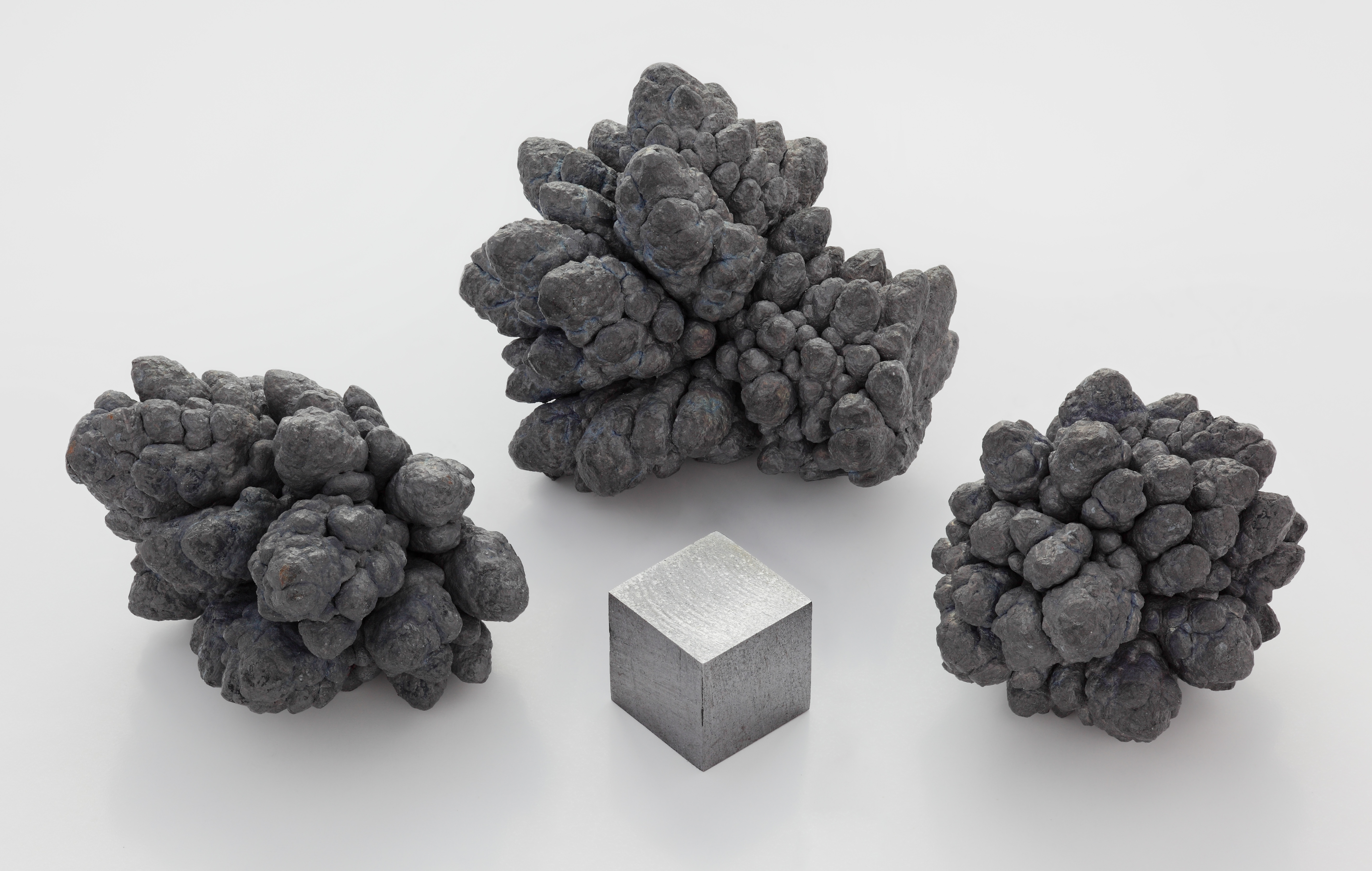
- Oxidized lead nodules and a high purity lead cube

Common connotations
- Lead, Black tin

Color coordinates
- Hex triplet: #7D7D7C
- sRGB^{B} (r, g, b): (125, 125, 124)
- HSV (h, s, v): (60°, 1%, 49%)
- CIELCh_{uv} (L, C, h): (52, 1, 86°)
- Source: Dulux Trade
- B: Normalized to [0–255] (byte)

Lead gray is a shade of gray resembling the color of a lead nodule. This color is widely used as a wall paint color.

=== Platinum ===
Platinum
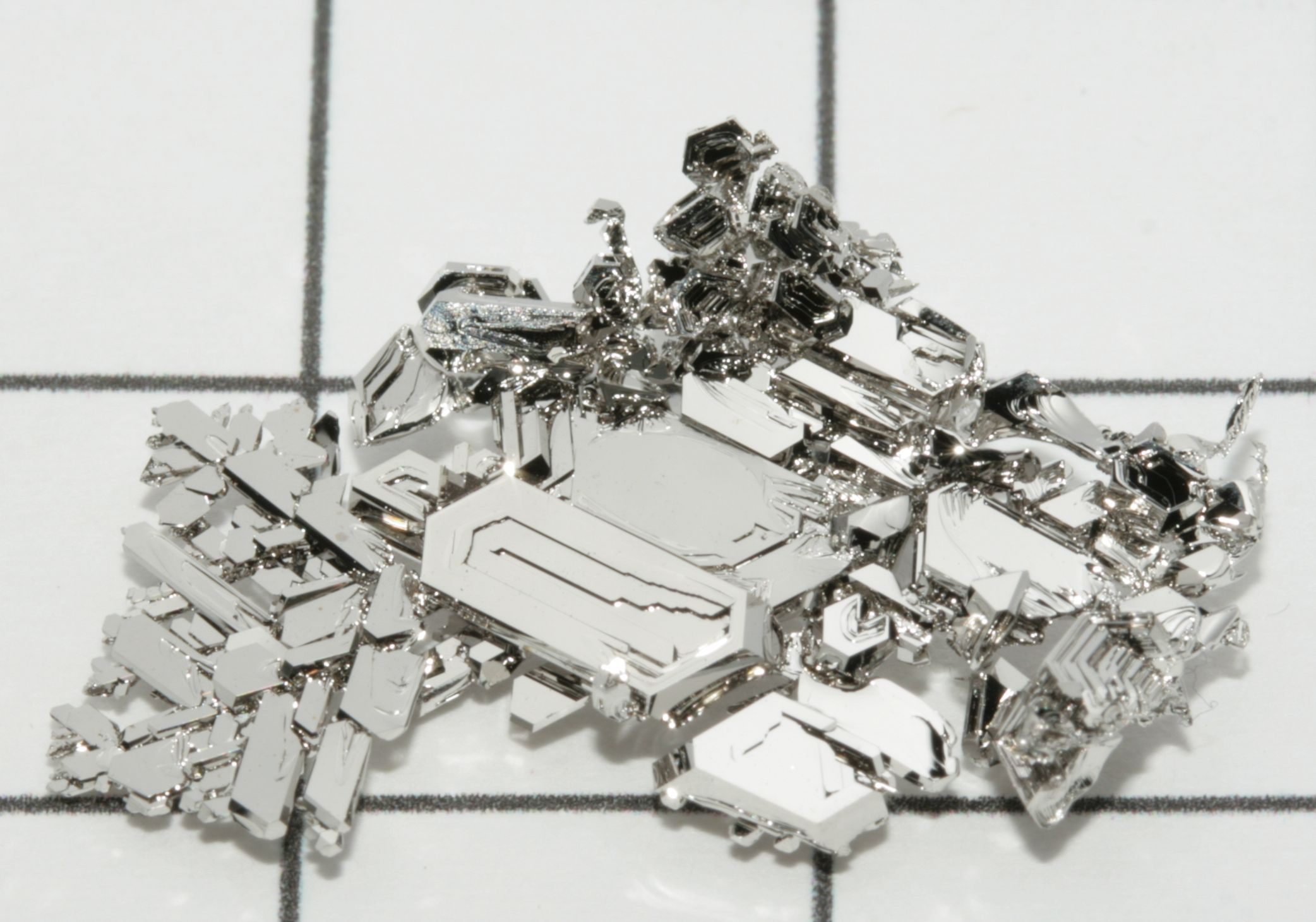
- Platinum crystals

Color coordinates
- Hex triplet: #E5E4E2
- sRGB^{B} (r, g, b): (229, 228, 226)
- HSV (h, s, v): (40°, 1%, 90%)
- CIELCh_{uv} (L, C, h): (91, 2, 68°)
- Source: Maerz and Paul
- ISCC–NBS descriptor: Yellowish white
- B: Normalized to [0–255] (byte)

Platinum is a color that is the metallic tint of pale grayish-white resembling the metal platinum.

This is supposed to be a metallic color; however, there is no mechanism for displaying metallic colors on a flat computer screen.

The first recorded use of platinum as a color name in English was in 1918.

=== Stone gray ===
Stone gray
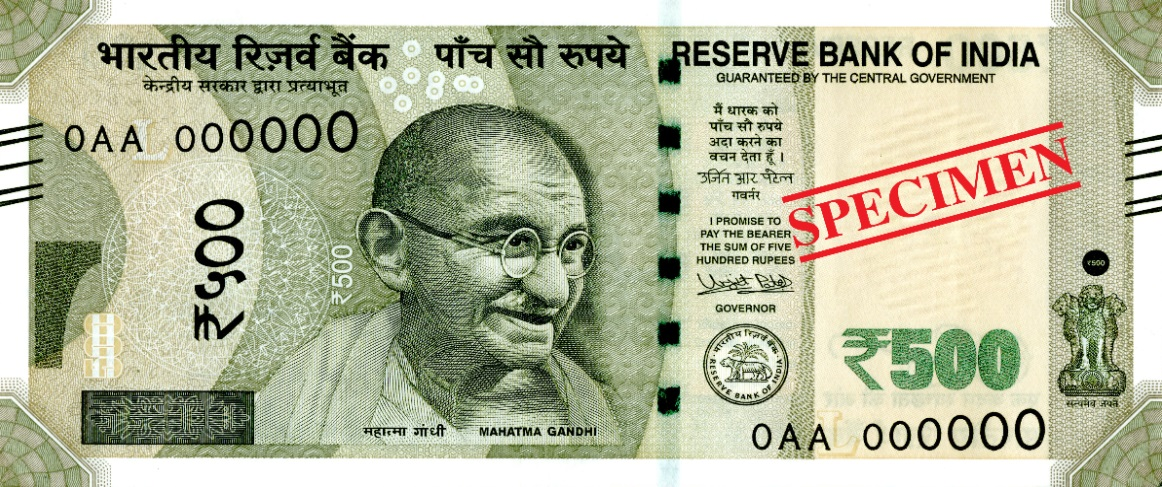
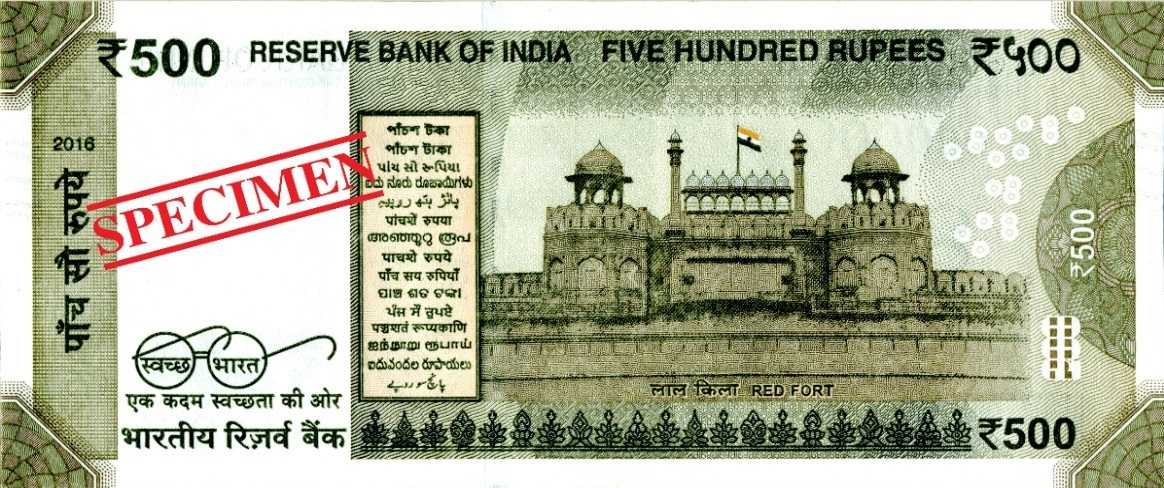
- Indian 500 rupee note, obverse and reverse

Color coordinates
- Hex triplet: #928E85
- sRGB^{B} (r, g, b): (146, 142, 133)
- HSV (h, s, v): (42°, 9%, 57%)
- CIELCh_{uv} (L, C, h): (59, 8, 69°)
- Source: List of RAL colors
- ISCC–NBS descriptor: Light grayish olive
- B: Normalized to [0–255] (byte)

Stone gray is a color represented in the list of RAL classic colors from RAL color standard. This is the main color on the Indian 500-rupee note.

=== Taupe gray ===
Taupe Gray

Color coordinates
- Hex triplet: #8B8589
- sRGB^{B} (r, g, b): (139, 133, 137)
- HSV (h, s, v): (320°, 4%, 55%)
- CIELCh_{uv} (L, C, h): (56, 4, 323°)
- Source: ISCC-NBS
- ISCC–NBS descriptor: Medium gray
- B: Normalized to [0–255] (byte)

Displayed adjacent is the color taupe gray.

=== Xanadu ===
Xanadu

Color coordinates
- Hex triplet: #738678
- sRGB^{B} (r, g, b): (115, 134, 120)
- HSV (h, s, v): (136°, 14%, 53%)
- CIELCh_{uv} (L, C, h): (54, 13, 138°)
- Source: Xona.com color list, in turn from the 2001 Resene RGB Values List
- ISCC–NBS descriptor: Moderate green
- B: Normalized to [0–255] (byte)

Displayed in the adjacent image is the color xanadu.

The color "xanadu" is a greenish-gray color whose name is derived from the Philodendron. The color ultimately comes from the 2001 Resene RGB Values List.

=== Zinc gray ===
Zinc Gray

Color coordinates
- Hex triplet: #655B55
- sRGB^{B} (r, g, b): (101, 91, 85)
- HSV (h, s, v): (22°, 16%, 40%)
- CIELCh_{uv} (L, C, h): (39, 8, 42°)
- Source: List of RAL colors
- ISCC–NBS descriptor: Reddish gray
- B: Normalized to [0–255] (byte)

Zinc gray is a color represented in the list of RAL Design System Plus colors from RAL color standard. This is the color zinc tarnishes into as it oxidizes.

=== Zircon gray ===
Zircon Gray

Color coordinates
- Hex triplet: #807473
- sRGB^{B} (r, g, b): (128, 116, 115)
- HSV (h, s, v): (5°, 10%, 50%)
- CIELCh_{uv} (L, C, h): (50, 7, 18°)
- Source: List of RAL colors
- ISCC–NBS descriptor: Reddish gray
- B: Normalized to [0–255] (byte)

Zircon gray is a color represented in the list of RAL Design System Plus colors from RAL color standard. This is one of several possible colors for zircon.

== Cool grays ==
Cool grays have noticeably bluish, greenish, or violetish hues.

=== Blue-gray ===
Blue-gray

Color coordinates
- Hex triplet: #6699CC
- sRGB^{B} (r, g, b): (102, 153, 204)
- HSV (h, s, v): (210°, 50%, 80%)
- CIELCh_{uv} (L, C, h): (62, 54, 244°)
- Source: Crayola
- ISCC–NBS descriptor: Light blue
- B: Normalized to [0–255] (byte)

Blue-gray was a Crayola crayon color from 1958 to 1990.

=== Cadet ===
Cadet

Color coordinates
- Hex triplet: #536872
- sRGB^{B} (r, g, b): (83, 104, 114)
- HSV (h, s, v): (199°, 27%, 45%)
- CIELCh_{uv} (L, C, h): (43, 15, 224°)
- ISCC–NBS descriptor: Grayish blue
- B: Normalized to [0–255] (byte)

The first recorded use of cadet as a color name in English was in 1915.

=== Cadet gray ===
Cadet gray

Color coordinates
- Hex triplet: #91A3B0
- sRGB^{B} (r, g, b): (145, 163, 176)
- HSV (h, s, v): (205°, 18%, 69%)
- CIELCh_{uv} (L, C, h): (66, 16, 231°)
- Source: ISCC-NBS
- ISCC–NBS descriptor: Grayish blue
- B: Normalized to [0–255] (byte)

Cadet gray is a slightly bluish shade of gray. The first recorded use of cadet grey as a color name in English was in 1912.

Before 1912, the word cadet gray was used as a name for a type of military issue uniforms. Most famously, it was the color of the uniforms of the Confederate Army. In 1815, it had earlier become the color of the uniforms of the United States Military Academy (West Point).

=== Cool gray ===
Cool gray

Color coordinates
- Hex triplet: #9090C0
- sRGB^{B} (r, g, b): (144, 144, 192)
- HSV (h, s, v): (240°, 25%, 75%)
- CIELCh_{uv} (L, C, h): (61, 40, 266°)
- Source: ISCC-NBS
- ISCC–NBS descriptor: Light purplish blue
- B: Normalized to [0–255] (byte)

Cool gray, is a medium light color gray mixed with the color blue.

This color is a dull shade of blue-gray.

This color is identical with color sample No. 203 (identified as gray blue) at the following website: http://tx4.us/nbs/nbs-g.htm—The ISCC-NBS Dictionary of Colo(u)r Names (1955), a website for stamp collectors to evaluate the colors of their stamps.

Poet George Sterling once wrote a poem calling San Francisco the "cool grey city of love" The phrase cool grey as applied to San Francisco refers to the frequent fogs from the Pacific Ocean that envelop the city.

=== Feldgrau ===
Feldgrau
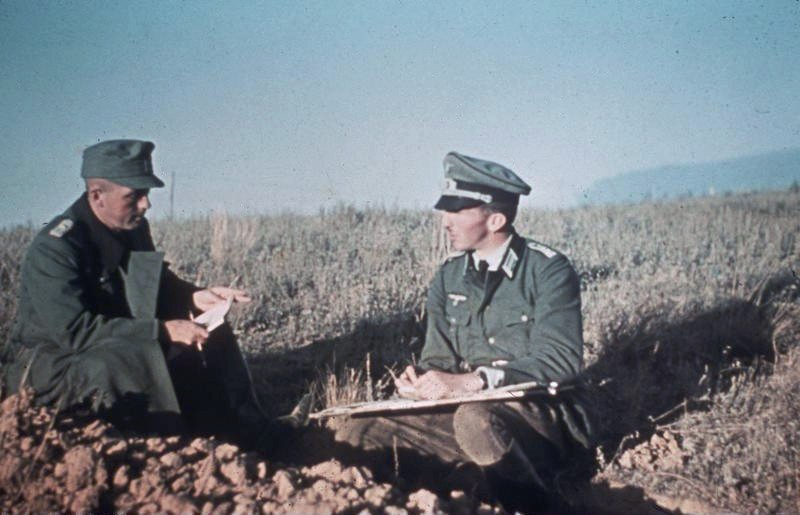
- Feldgrau of the Wehrmacht (Stalingrad 1942)

Color coordinates
- Hex triplet: #4D5D53
- sRGB^{B} (r, g, b): (77, 93, 83)
- HSV (h, s, v): (142°, 17%, 36%)
- CIELCh_{uv} (L, C, h): (38, 10, 144°)
- ISCC–NBS descriptor: Dark grayish green
- B: Normalized to [0–255] (byte)

Feldgrau (German for "field gray") is a green-gray color that was the official basic color of military uniforms of the German armed forces from 1907 until 1945 for West Germany or 1989 for East Germany.

=== Glaucous ===
Glaucous
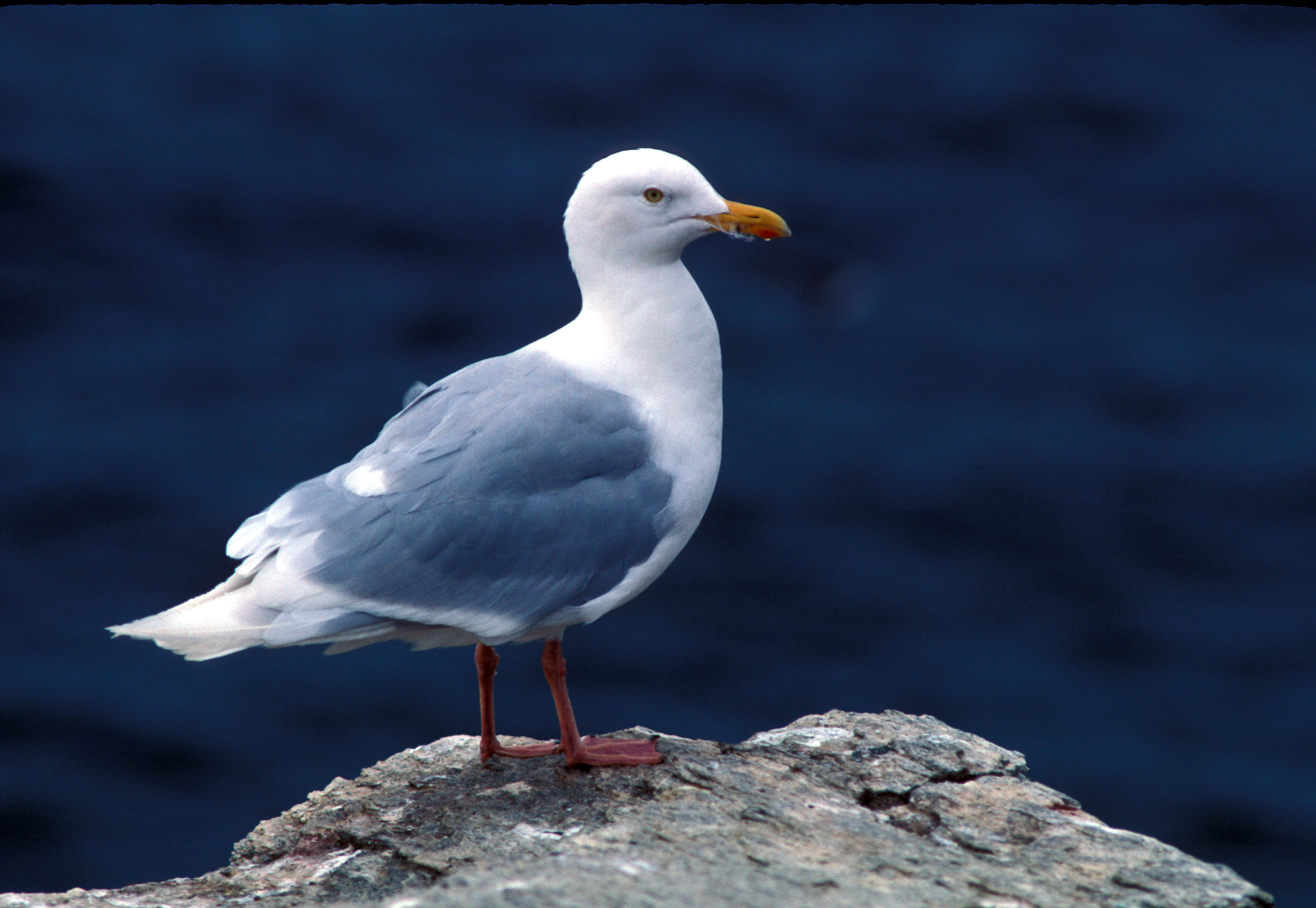
- Glaucous gull

Color coordinates
- Hex triplet: #6082B6
- sRGB^{B} (r, g, b): (96, 130, 182)
- HSV (h, s, v): (216°, 47%, 71%)
- CIELCh_{uv} (L, C, h): (54, 51, 250°)
- Source: ISCC-NBS
- ISCC–NBS descriptor: Moderate blue
- B: Normalized to [0–255] (byte)

Glaucous (from the Latin glaucus, meaning "bluish-gray", from the Greek glaukos) is used to describe the pale gray or blue appearance of the surfaces of some plants, as well as in the names of birds, such as the glaucous gull (Larus hyperboreus), glaucous-winged gull (Larus glaucescens), glaucous macaw (Anodorhynchus glaucus), and glaucous tanager (Thraupis glaucocolpa).

=== Gray-green ===
Gray-green

Color coordinates
- Hex triplet: #5E716A
- sRGB^{B} (r, g, b): (94, 113, 106)
- HSV (h, s, v): (158°, 17%, 44%)
- CIELCh_{uv} (L, C, h): (46, 10, 161°)
- Source: ISCC-NBS
- ISCC–NBS descriptor: Grayish green
- B: Normalized to [0–255] (byte)

Gray-green (also known as grayish-green, greenish-gray, emerald-gray, or green-gray) is a greenish-gray color.

=== Marengo ===
Marengo

Color coordinates
- Hex triplet: #4C5866
- sRGB^{B} (r, g, b): (76, 88, 102)
- HSV (h, s, v): (212°, 25%, 40%)
- CIELCh_{uv} (L, C, h): (37, 14, 242°)
- ISCC–NBS descriptor: Grayish blue
- B: Normalized to [0–255] (byte)

Marengo is a shade of gray (black with gray tinge) or blue colors. Sometimes the color is described as the color of a wet asphalt.

=== Nardo gray ===
Nardo gray

Color coordinates
- Hex triplet: #686a6c
- sRGB^{B} (r, g, b): (104, 106, 108)
- HSV (h, s, v): (210°, 4%, 42%)
- CIELCh_{uv} (L, C, h): (45, 2, 236°)
- B: Normalized to [0–255] (byte)

Nardo gray is a color chosen by Audi in 2013 for their new RS7. Since featuring this color, many other vehicle companies copied their lead and introduced a similar color availability for their cars and SUVs.

The color code is Y7C.

=== Slate gray ===
Slate gray
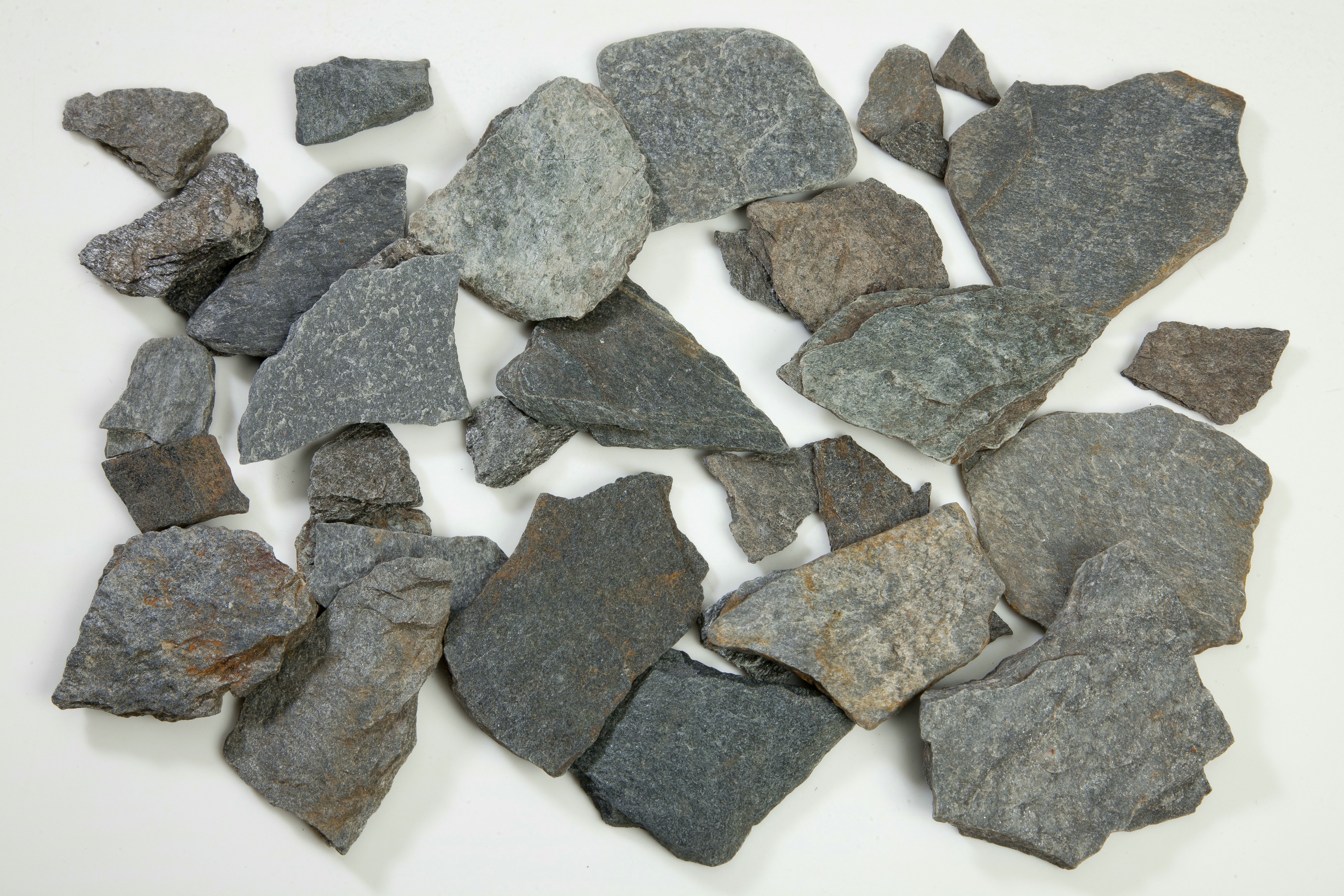
- Samples of slate

Color coordinates
- Hex triplet: #708090
- sRGB^{B} (r, g, b): (112, 128, 144)
- HSV (h, s, v): (210°, 22%, 56%)
- CIELCh_{uv} (L, C, h): (53, 17, 239°)
- Source: X11
- ISCC–NBS descriptor: Grayish blue
- B: Normalized to [0–255] (byte)

Slate gray is a gray color with a slight azure tinge that is a representation of the average color of the material slate.

The first recorded use of slate gray as a color name in English was in 1705.

== Warm grays ==
Warm grays are colors that are noticeably brownish, pinkish grays, or reddish purple grays. The color brown is itself a dark shade of orange. Brown colors also include dark shades of rose, red, and amber. Pink colors include light tones of rose, red, and orange. These tones of pink become warm grays when they are mixed with gray.

=== Cinereous ===
Cinereous

Color coordinates
- Hex triplet: #98817B
- sRGB^{B} (r, g, b): (152, 129, 123)
- HSV (h, s, v): (12°, 19%, 60%)
- CIELCh_{uv} (L, C, h): (56, 16, 27°)
- Source: Maerz and Paul
- ISCC–NBS descriptor: Light grayish brown
- B: Normalized to [0–255] (byte)

Cinereous is a color, ashy gray in appearance, either consisting of or resembling ashes, or a gray color tinged with coppery brown. It is derived from the Latin cinereous, from cinis (ashes).

The first recorded use of cinereous as a color name in English was in 1661.

=== Greige ===
Greige

Color coordinates
- Hex triplet: #B0A999
- sRGB^{B} (r, g, b): (176, 169, 153)
- HSV (h, s, v): (42°, 13%, 69%)
- CIELCh_{uv} (L, C, h): (69, 14, 69°)
- Source: ColorXS
- ISCC–NBS descriptor: Grayish Brown
- B: Normalized to [0–255] (byte)

Some shades of Greige
- Light Greige

This is a warm gray that combines beige and gray. Its name is believed to have originated from the French word "gris," meaning gray.

Georgio Armani pioneered its use in fashion in 1975.

=== Rose quartz ===
Rose quartz

Color coordinates
- Hex triplet: #AA98A9
- sRGB^{B} (r, g, b): (170, 152, 169)
- HSV (h, s, v): (303°, 11%, 67%)
- CIELCh_{uv} (L, C, h): (65, 14, 310°)
- Source: ISCC-NBS
- ISCC–NBS descriptor: Pale purple
- B: Normalized to [0–255] (byte)

There is a grayish tone of rose called rose quartz.

The first recorded use of rose quartz as a color name in English was in 1926.

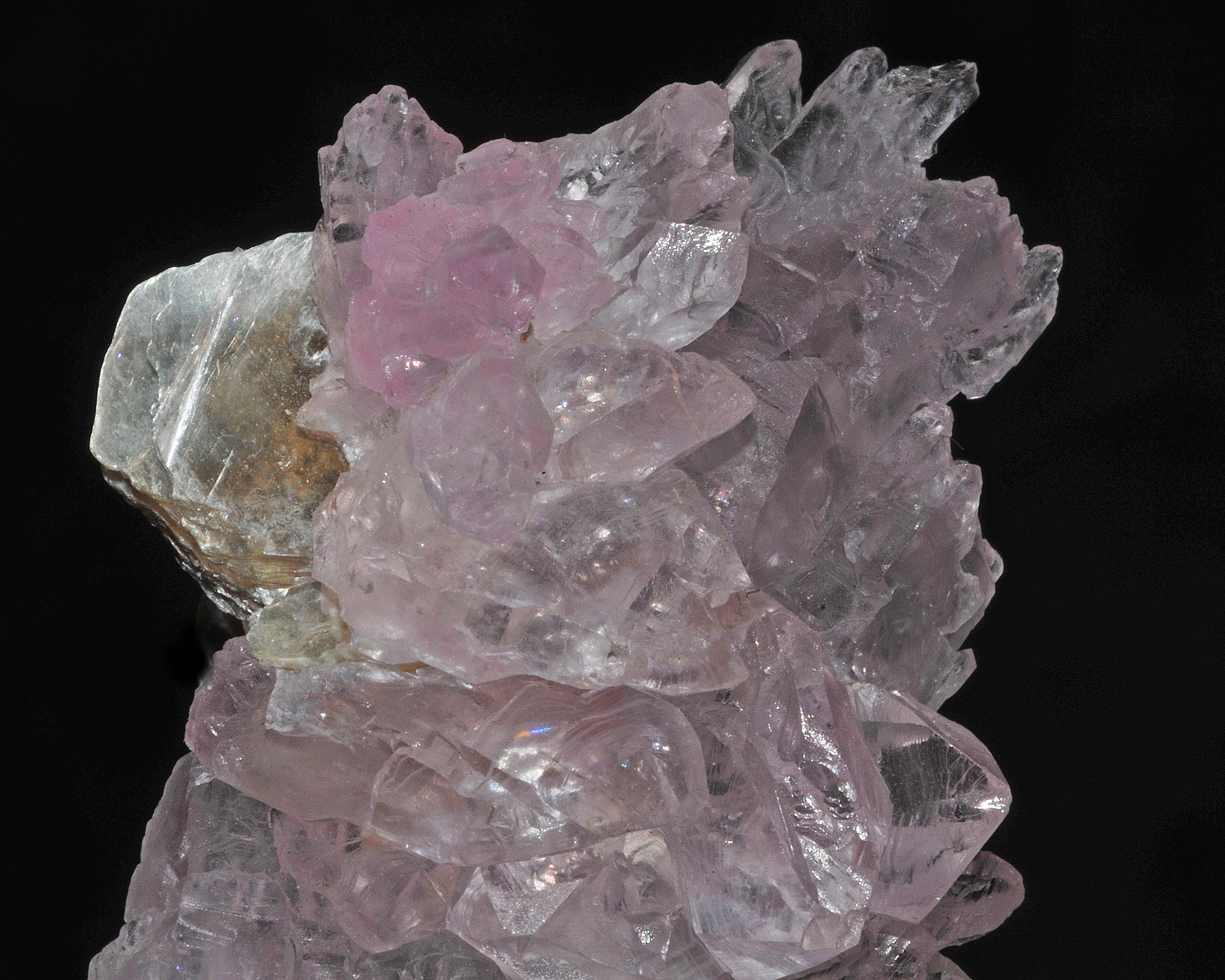
Rose quartz crystals on muscovite

=== Taupe ===
Taupe

Color coordinates
- Hex triplet: #483C32
- sRGB^{B} (r, g, b): (72, 60, 50)
- HSV (h, s, v): (27°, 31%, 28%)
- CIELCh_{uv} (L, C, h): (26, 11, 47°)
- Source: ISCC-NBS
- ISCC–NBS descriptor: Dark grayish yellowish brown
- B: Normalized to [0–255] (byte)

The color displayed at right matches the color sample called taupe referenced below in the 1930 book A Dictionary of Color, the world standard for color terms before the invention of computers. However, the word taupe may often be used to refer to lighter shades of taupe today, and therefore another name for this color is dark taupe.

The first use of taupe as a color name in English was in the early 19th century.

== See also ==
- Eigengrau
- Feldgrau
- Payne's gray
- Shades of black
- Shades of white

== Bibliography ==
- Maerz, Aloys John and Paul, M. Rea (1930) A Dictionary of Color, New York: McGraw-Hill
