= Disambiguation (disambiguation) =

Disambiguation is the process of identifying which meaning of a word is used in context.

Disambiguation may also refer to:

== Music ==
- Disambiguation (Pandelis Karayorgis and Mat Maneri album), 2002
- Ø (Disambiguation), a 2010 album by Underoath

== Other uses ==
- Author name disambiguation, process of removing ambiguity, related to the names of people
- Memory disambiguation, a set of microprocessor execution techniques
- Semantic disambiguation, the problem of resolving semantic ambiguity
- Sentence boundary disambiguation, the problem in natural language processing of deciding where sentences begin and end
- Syntactic disambiguation, the problem of resolving syntactic ambiguity

== See also ==
- Ambiguity (disambiguation)
- Category:Disambiguation pages
