= Ambiguity =

Type of uncertainty of meaning where several interpretations are possible

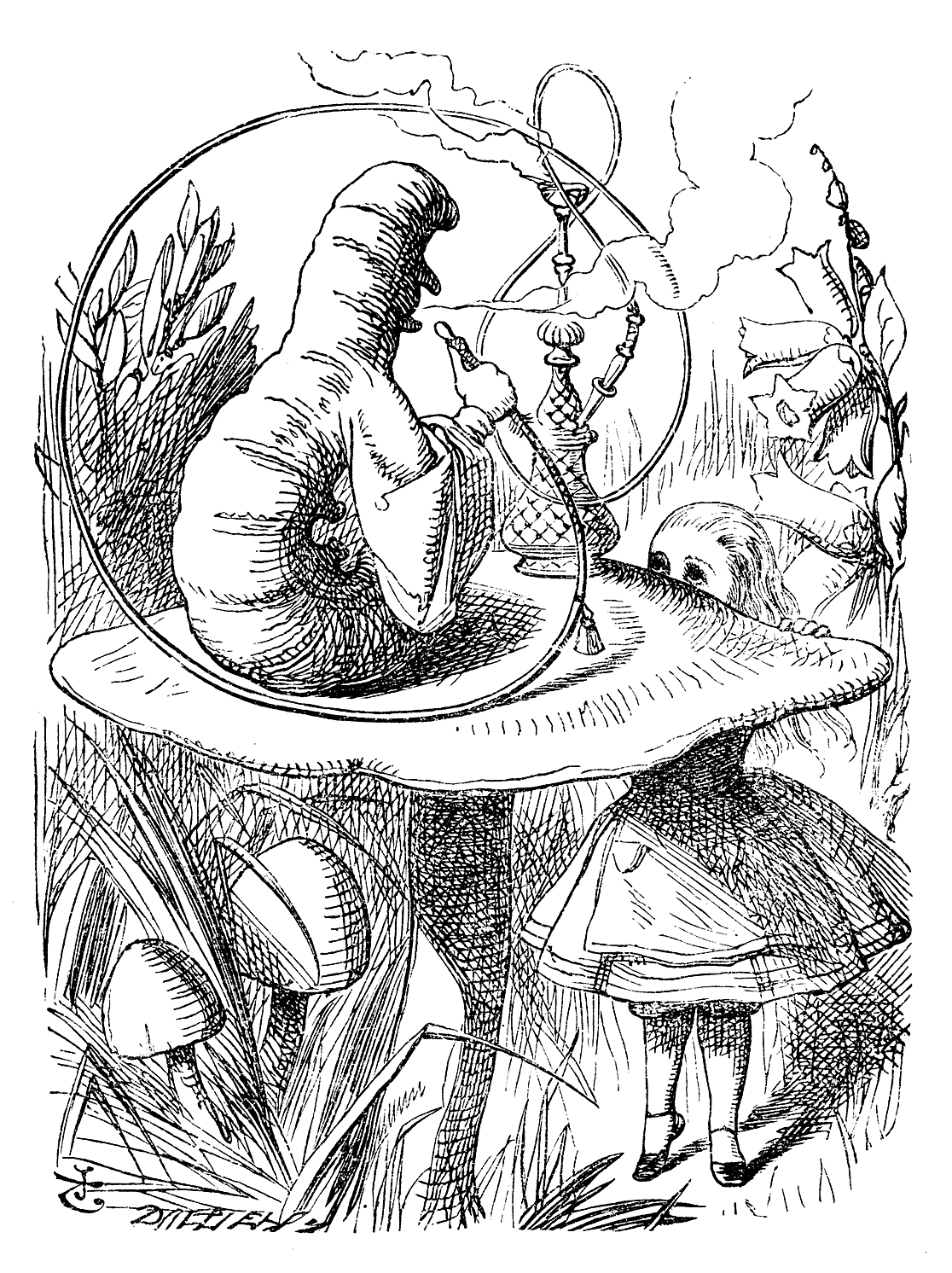
Sir John Tenniel's illustration of the Caterpillar for Lewis Carroll's Alice's Adventures in Wonderland is noted for its ambiguous central figure, whose head can be viewed as either a man's face with a pointed nose and chin smoking a pipe or as the end of an actual caterpillar, with the first two right "true" legs visible (1865).

Ambiguity, is a state in which the meaning of a phrase, statement, situation, or resolution is not explicitly defined, making for several plausible interpretations. It arises when available information lacks sufficient context or a shared frame, so people cannot reliably determine what the problem is, what matters, what causes what, or what solution would count as correct. As a result, interpretation depends heavily on prior experience, assumptions, and imagination.

An outcome of ambiguity is uncertainty, but uncertainty itself refers to a state in which outcomes or meanings are known but their likelihood, stability, or implications cannot be reliably assessed. Ambiguity is not simply the absence of information. It is the lack of meaning and direction caused by insufficient context and unclear framing, which obstructs the ability to determine what counts as a valid interpretation or resolution. The prefix ambi- reflects the idea of “two” or “multiple,” as in multiple possible meanings.

The concept of ambiguity is generally contrasted with vagueness. In ambiguity, multiple distinct interpretations compete because the frame of meaning is unclear and is shaped by personal history and mental models. With vagueness, in contrast, the general interpretation is often understood, but the boundaries are fuzzy, so it is difficult to specify the meaning at the desired level of precision.

== Linguistic forms ==
Lexical ambiguity is contrasted with semantic ambiguity. The former represents a choice between a finite number of known and meaningful context-dependent interpretations. The latter represents a choice between any number of possible interpretations, none of which may have a standard agreed-upon meaning. This form of ambiguity is closely related to vagueness.

Ambiguity in human language is argued to reflect principles of efficient communication. Languages that communicate efficiently will avoid sending information that is redundant with information provided in the context. This can be shown mathematically to result in a system that is ambiguous when context is neglected. In this way, ambiguity is viewed as a generally useful feature of a linguistic system.

Linguistic ambiguity can be a problem in law, because the interpretation of written documents and oral agreements is often of paramount importance.

Structural analysis of an ambiguous Spanish sentence: Pepe vio a Pablo enfurecido. Interpretation 1: When Pepe was angry, then he saw Pablo. Interpretation 2: Pepe saw that Pablo was angry. Here, the syntactic tree in the figure represents interpretation 2.

=== Lexical ambiguity ===
The lexical ambiguity of a word or phrase applies to it having more than one meaning in the language to which the word belongs. "Meaning" here refers to whatever should be represented by a good dictionary. For instance, the word "bank" has several distinct lexical definitions, including "financial institution" and "edge of a river". Or consider "apothecary". One could say, "I bought herbs from the apothecary". This could mean one actually spoke to the apothecary (pharmacist) or went to the apothecary (pharmacy).

The context in which an ambiguous word is used often makes it clearer which of the meanings is intended. If, for instance, someone says, "I put $100 in the bank", most people would not think someone used a shovel to dig in the mud. However, some linguistic contexts do not provide sufficient information to make a used word clearer.

Lexical ambiguity can be addressed by algorithmic methods that automatically associate the appropriate meaning with a word in context, a task referred to as word-sense disambiguation.

The use of multi-defined words requires the author or speaker to clarify their context and sometimes elaborate on their specific intended meaning (in which case, a less ambiguous term should have been used). The goal of clear, concise communication is that the receiver(s) have no misunderstanding about what was meant to be conveyed. An exception to this could include a politician whose "weasel words" and obfuscation are necessary to gain support from multiple constituents with mutually exclusive conflicting desires from their candidate of choice. Ambiguity is a powerful tool of political science.

More problematic are words whose multiple meanings express closely related concepts. "Good", for example, can mean "useful" or "functional" (That's a good hammer), "exemplary" (She's a good student), "pleasing" (This is good soup), "moral" (a good person versus the lesson to be learned from a story), "righteous", etc. "I have a good daughter" is not clear about which sense is intended. The various ways to apply prefixes and suffixes can also create ambiguity ("unlockable" can mean "capable of being opened" or "impossible to lock").

=== Semantic and syntactic ambiguity ===
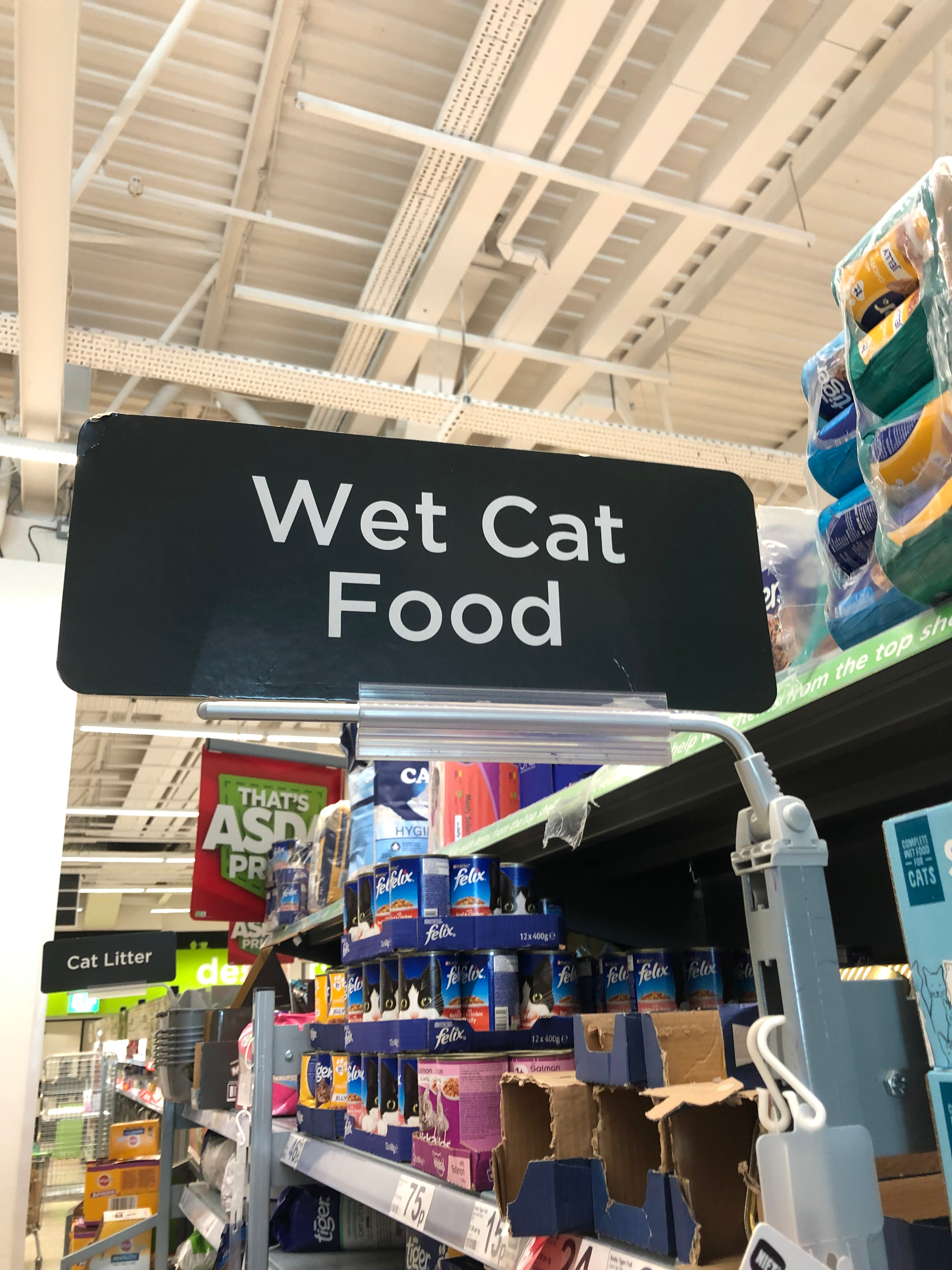
Is this sign saying there’s food for wet cats, or wet food for cats?

Semantic ambiguity occurs when a word, phrase, or sentence has more than one possible interpretation. For example, in the sentence "We saw her duck", the phrase "her duck" is ambiguous and can mean:

1. the woman’s bird (noun phrase where the noun duck is modified by the possessive pronoun her), or
2. an action the woman performed (verb phrase with duck as a verb and her as the object of saw).

"We saw her duck" contains syntactic ambiguity in addition to semantic ambiguity. Syntactic ambiguity arises when a sentence can have different meanings because of the structure of the sentence, or syntax. This is often due to a modifying expression, such as a prepositional phrase, the application of which is unclear. For example, the sentence "He ate the cookies on the couch" could mean that he ate the cookies that were on the couch (as opposed to those that were on the table), or it could mean that he was sitting on the couch when he ate the cookies. Only rewriting the sentence or placing appropriate punctuation can resolve a syntactic ambiguity. For syntactic ambiguity in formal languages (such as computer programming languages), see ambiguous grammar.

Conversely, a sentence like "He ate the cookies on the couch" is also semantically ambiguous. Rarely, but occasionally, the different parsings of a syntactically ambiguous phrase result in the same meaning. For example, the command "Cook, cook!" can be parsed as "Cook (noun of address), cook (imperative verb form)!", but also as "Cook (imperative verb form), cook (noun of address)!" It is more common that a syntactically unambiguous phrase has a semantic ambiguity; for example, the lexical ambiguity in "Your boss is a funny man" is purely semantic, leading to the response "Funny ha-ha or funny peculiar?"

Spoken language can contain many more types of ambiguities that are called phonological ambiguities, where there is more than one way to compose a set of sounds into words, such as "ice cream" and "I scream". Such ambiguity is generally resolved according to the context. A mishearing of such, based on incorrectly resolved ambiguity, is called a mondegreen.

== Philosophy ==
Philosophers (and other users of logic) spend a lot of time and effort searching for and removing (or intentionally adding) ambiguity in arguments because it can lead to incorrect conclusions and can be used to deliberately conceal bad arguments. For example, a politician might say, "I oppose taxes which hinder economic growth", an example of a glittering generality. Some will think they oppose taxes in general because they hinder economic growth. Others may think they oppose only those taxes that they believe will hinder economic growth. In writing, the sentence can be rewritten to reduce possible misinterpretation, either by adding a comma after "taxes" (to convey the first sense), or by changing "which" to "that" (to convey the second sense), or by rewriting it in other ways. The devious politician hopes that each constituent will interpret the statement in the most desirable way, and think the politician supports everyone's opinion. However, the opposite can also be true—an opponent can turn a positive statement into a bad one if the speaker uses ambiguity (intentionally or not). The logical fallacies of amphiboly and equivocation rely heavily on the use of ambiguous words and phrases.

In continental philosophy (particularly phenomenology and existentialism), there is much greater tolerance of ambiguity, as it is generally seen as an integral part of the human condition. Martin Heidegger argued that the relation between the subject and object is ambiguous, as is the relation of mind and body and part and whole. In Heidegger's phenomenology, Dasein is always in a meaningful world, but there is always an underlying background for every instance of signification. Thus, although some things may be certain, they have little to do with Dasein's sense of care and existential anxiety, e.g., in the face of death. In calling his work Being and Nothingness an "essay in phenomenological ontology" Jean-Paul Sartre follows Heidegger in defining the human essence as ambiguous, or relating fundamentally to such ambiguity. Simone de Beauvoir tries to base an ethics on Heidegger's and Sartre's writings (The Ethics of Ambiguity), where she highlights the need to grapple with ambiguity:

as long as there have been philosophers and they have thought, most of them have tried to mask it ... And the ethics which they have proposed to their disciples has always pursued the same goal. It has been a matter of eliminating the ambiguity by making oneself pure inwardness or pure externality, by escaping from the sensible world or being engulfed by it, by yielding to eternity or enclosing oneself in the pure moment.

Ethics cannot be based on the authoritative certainty given by mathematics and logic, or prescribed directly from the empirical findings of science. She states: "Since we do not succeed in fleeing it, let us, therefore, try to look the truth in the face. Let us try to assume our fundamental ambiguity. It is in the knowledge of the genuine conditions of our life that we must draw our strength to live and our reason for acting".

== Literature and rhetoric ==
In literature and rhetoric, ambiguity can be a useful tool. Groucho Marx's classic joke depends on a grammatical ambiguity for its humor, for example: "Last night I shot an elephant in my pajamas. How he got in my pajamas, I'll never know". Songs and poetry often rely on ambiguous words for artistic effect, as in the song title "Don't It Make My Brown Eyes Blue" (where "blue" can refer to the color or to sadness).

In the narrative, ambiguity can be introduced in several ways: motive, plot, and character. F. Scott Fitzgerald uses the latter type of ambiguity with notable effect in his novel The Great Gatsby.

== Mathematical notation ==
Mathematical notation is a helpful tool that eliminates a lot of misunderstandings associated with natural language in physics and other sciences. Nonetheless, there are still some inherent ambiguities due to lexical, syntactic, and semantic reasons that persist in mathematical notation.

=== Names of functions ===
The ambiguity in the style of writing a function should not be confused with a multivalued function, which can (and should) be defined in a deterministic and unambiguous way. Several special functions still do not have established notations. Usually, the conversion to another notation requires scaling the argument or the resulting value; sometimes, the same name of the function is used, causing confusion. Examples of such under-established functions:

- Sinc function
- Elliptic integral of the third kind; translating elliptic integral form from MAPLE to Mathematica, one should replace the second argument with its square; dealing with complex values, this may cause problems.
- Exponential integral
- Hermite polynomial

=== Expressions ===
Ambiguous or "ill-defined" expressions often appear in physical and mathematical texts. It is common practice to omit multiplication signs in mathematical expressions. Also, it is common to give the same name to a variable and a function, for example, $f=f(x)$. Then, if one sees $f=f(y+1)$, there is no way to distinguish whether it means $f=f(x)$ multiplied by $(y+1)$, or function $f$ evaluated at argument equal to $(y+1)$. In each case of use of such notations, the reader is supposed to be able to perform the deduction and reveal the true meaning.

Creators of algorithmic languages try to avoid ambiguities. Many algorithmic languages (C++ and Fortran) require the character * as a symbol of multiplication. The Wolfram Language used in Mathematica allows the user to omit the multiplication symbol but requires square brackets to indicate the argument of a function; square brackets are not allowed for grouping of expressions. Fortran, in addition, does not allow the use of the same name (identifier) for different objects, for example, a function and a variable; in particular, the expression $f = f(x)$ is qualified as an error.

The order of operations may depend on the context. In most programming languages, the operations of division and multiplication have equal priority and are executed from left to right. Until the last century, many editorials assumed that multiplication is performed first, for example, $a/bc$ is interpreted as $a/(bc)$; in this case, the insertion of parentheses is required when translating the formulas to an algorithmic language. In addition, it is common to write an argument of a function without parentheses, which also may lead to ambiguity. In the scientific journal style, one uses Roman letters to denote elementary functions, whereas variables are written using italics. For example, in mathematical journals the expression $s i n$ does not denote the sine function but the product of the three variables $s$, $i$, $n$, although in the informal notation of a slide presentation it may stand for $\sin$.

Commas in multi-component subscripts and superscripts are sometimes omitted; this is also potentially ambiguous notation. For example, in the notation $T_{mnk}$, the reader can only infer from the context whether it means a single-index object, taken with the subscript equal to the product of variables $m$, $n$ and $k$, or it is an indication of a trivalent tensor.

=== Examples of potentially confusing ambiguous mathematical expressions ===
An expression such as $\sin^2\alpha/2$ can be understood to mean either $(\sin(\alpha/2))^2$ or $(\sin \alpha)^2/2$. Often the author's intention can be understood from the context, in cases where only one of the two makes sense, but an ambiguity like this should be avoided, for example by writing $\sin^2(\alpha/2)$ or $\frac{1}{2}\sin^2\alpha$.

The expression $\sin^{-1}\alpha$ means $\arcsin(\alpha)$ in several texts, though it might be thought to mean $(\sin \alpha)^{-1}$, since $\sin^{n} \alpha$ commonly means $(\sin \alpha)^{n}$. Conversely, $\sin^2 \alpha$ might seem to mean $\sin(\sin \alpha)$, as this exponentiation notation usually denotes function iteration: in general, $f^2(x)$ means $f(f(x))$. However, for trigonometric and hyperbolic functions, this notation conventionally means exponentiation of the result of function application.

The expression $a/2b$ can be interpreted as meaning $(a/2)b$; however, it is more commonly understood to mean $a/(2b)$.

=== Notations in quantum optics and quantum mechanics ===
It is common to define the coherent states in quantum optics with $~|\alpha\rangle~$ and states with a fixed number of photons with $~|n\rangle~$. Then, there is an "unwritten rule": the state is coherent if there are more Greek characters than Latin characters in the argument and $n$-photon state if the Latin characters dominate. The ambiguity becomes even worse, if $~|x\rangle~$ is used for the states with a certain value of the coordinate and $~|p\rangle~$ means the state with a certain value of the momentum, which may be used in books on quantum mechanics. Such ambiguities easily lead to confusions, especially if some normalized adimensional, dimensionless variables are used. Expression $|1\rangle$ may mean a state with a single photon, or the coherent state with mean amplitude equal to 1, or state with momentum equal to unity, and so on. The reader is supposed to guess from the context.

=== Ambiguous terms in physics and mathematics ===
Some physical quantities do not yet have established notations; their value (and sometimes even dimension, as in the case of the Einstein coefficients) depends on the system of notations. Many terms are ambiguous. Each use of an ambiguous term should be preceded by the definition suitable for a specific case. Just like Ludwig Wittgenstein states in Tractatus Logico-Philosophicus: "... Only in the context of a proposition has a name meaning."

A highly confusing term is gain. For example, the sentence "the gain of a system should be doubled", without context, means close to nothing.

- It may mean that the ratio of the output voltage of an electric circuit to the input voltage should be doubled.
- It may mean that the ratio of the output power of an electric or optical circuit to the input power should be doubled.
- It may mean that the gain of the laser medium should be doubled, for example, doubling the population of the upper laser level in a quasi-two-level system (assuming negligible absorption of the ground state).

The term intensity is ambiguous when applied to light. The term can refer to any of irradiance, luminous intensity, radiant intensity, or radiance, depending on the background of the person using the term.

Also, confusions may be related to the use of atomic percent as a measure of concentration of a dopant or resolution of an imaging system as a measure of the size of the smallest detail that can be resolved at the background of statistical noise. See also Accuracy and precision.

The Berry paradox arises as a result of systematic ambiguity in the meaning of terms such as "definable" or "nameable". Terms of this kind give rise to vicious circle fallacies. Other terms with this type of ambiguity are: satisfiable, true, false, function, property, class, relation, cardinal, and ordinal.

== Mathematical interpretation of ambiguity ==
The Necker cube and impossible cube, are underdetermined and overdetermined objects, respectively.

In mathematics and logic, ambiguity can be considered to be an instance of the logical concept of underdetermination—for example, $X=Y$ leaves open what the value of $X$ is—while overdetermination, except when like $X=1, X=1, X=1$, is a self-contradiction, also called inconsistency, paradoxicalness, or oxymoron, or in mathematics, an inconsistent system—such as $X=2, X=3$, which has no solution.

Logical ambiguity and self-contradiction are analogous to visual ambiguity and impossible objects, such as the Necker cube and impossible cube, or many of the drawings of M. C. Escher.

== The social sciences ==
Ambiguity in the social sciences refers to situations, meanings, identities, or social arrangements that resist clear classification or stable interpretation. Rather than viewing ambiguity as a problem to be resolved, scholars examine how uncertainty, indeterminacy, and multiplicity are actively lived, negotiated, and sometimes strategically maintained in social life. Across anthropology, sociology, and political theory, ambiguity has been used to analyse crisis, governance, moral reasoning, and social change, highlighting how people navigate competing norms, values, and futures. Attention to ambiguity foregrounds lived experience, affect, and power, showing how social actors make sense of complex worlds where outcomes, roles, and meanings remain unsettled.

Social scientists note that ambiguity has been examined or investigated across many disciplines concerned with knowledge and knowledge production, including mathematics, philosophy, logic, and the natural, behavioural, and social sciences. They show that these fields have variously treated ambiguity as something to control, resolve, or strategically use. In anthropology, early efforts to define and classify social and cultural life were similarly shaped by ambiguity, as categories were often marked by exceptions, contradictions, and overlap. Foundational studies of boundaries—such as those between the sacred and profane, purity and pollution, and myth and meaning—demonstrated how social order operates despite continual flux and indeterminacy.

== Constructed language ==
Some languages have been created with the intention of avoiding ambiguity, especially lexical ambiguity. Lojban and Loglan are two related languages that have been created for this, focusing chiefly on syntactic ambiguity. The languages can be both spoken and written. These languages are intended to provide greater technical precision over natural languages, although historically, such attempts at language improvement have been criticized. Languages composed from many diverse sources contain much ambiguity and inconsistency. The many exceptions to syntax and semantic rules are time-consuming and difficult to learn.

Controlled natural languages have been created in order to avoid ambiguity in natural language processing and knowledge representation.

== Biology ==
In structural biology, ambiguity has been recognized as a problem for studying protein conformations. The analysis of a protein's three-dimensional structure consists in dividing the macromolecule into subunits called domains. The difficulty of this task arises from the fact that different definitions of what a domain is can be used (e.g., folding autonomy, function, thermodynamic stability, or domain motions), which sometimes results in a single protein having different—yet equally valid—domain assignments.

== Religion ==
Christianity and Judaism employ the concept of paradox synonymously with "ambiguity". Many Christians and Jews endorse Rudolf Otto's description of the sacred as 'mysterium tremendum et fascinans,' the awe-inspiring mystery that fascinates humans. The orthodox Catholic writer G. K. Chesterton regularly employed paradox to tease out the meanings in common concepts that he found ambiguous or to reveal meaning often overlooked or forgotten in common phrases: the title of one of his most famous books, Orthodoxy (1908), itself employed such a paradox.

Within the scholarship of religion, it is generally considered that all kinds of supernatural or legendary creatures display ambiguity. Scholar of religion Arjan Sterken demonstrated that ambiguities can be demonstrated in five different dimensions for such beings: ontology (how such beings fit within a worldview), behaviour, allegiance (how and to what human and divine groups they allocate themselves), appearance, and location.

== Music ==
In music, pieces or sections that confound expectations and may be, or are, interpreted simultaneously in different ways are ambiguous. Examples being some polytonality, polymeter, other ambiguous meters or rhythms, and ambiguous phrasing, or (Stein 2005, p. 79) any aspect of music. The music of Africa is often purposely ambiguous. To quote Sir Donald Francis Tovey (1935, p. 195), "Theorists are apt to vex themselves with vain efforts to remove uncertainty just where it has a high aesthetic value."

== Visual art ==
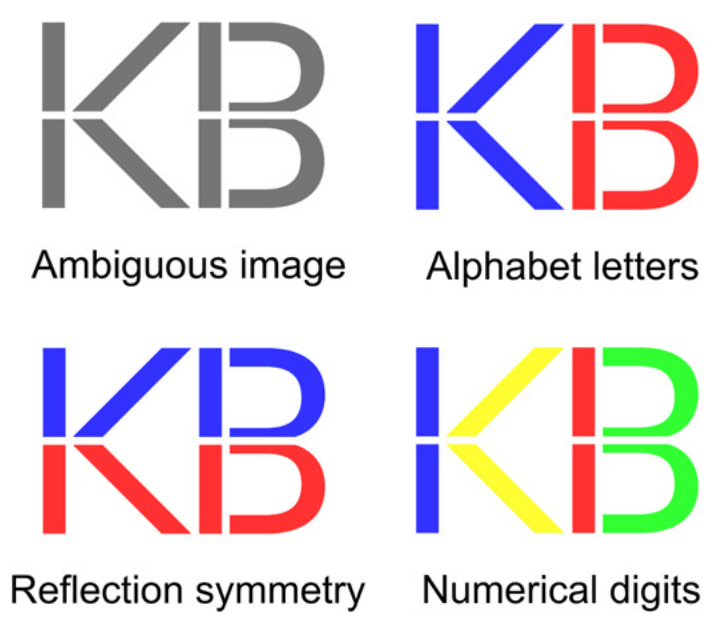
This image can be interpreted three ways: as the letters "K B", as the mathematical inequality "1 < 13", or as the letters "V D" with their mirror image.

In visual art, certain images are visually ambiguous, such as the Necker cube, which can be interpreted in two ways. Perceptions of such objects remain stable for a time, then may flip, a phenomenon called multistable perception. The opposite of such ambiguous images are impossible objects.

== Social psychology and the bystander effect ==
In social psychology, ambiguity is a factor used in determining people's responses to various situations. High levels of ambiguity in an emergency (e.g., an unconscious man lying on a park bench) make witnesses less likely to offer any sort of assistance, due to the fear that they may have misinterpreted the situation and acted unnecessarily. Alternately, non-ambiguous emergencies (e.g., an injured person verbally asking for help) elicit more consistent intervention and assistance. With regard to the bystander effect, studies have shown that emergencies deemed ambiguous trigger the appearance of the classic bystander effect (wherein more witnesses decrease the likelihood of them helping) far more than non-ambiguous emergencies.

== Computer science ==
In computer science, the SI prefixes kilo-, mega-, and giga- were historically used in certain contexts to mean either the first three powers of 1024 (1024, 1024^{2}, and 1024^{3}), contrary to the metric system, in which these units unambiguously mean one thousand, one million, and one billion. This usage is particularly prevalent with electronic memory devices (e.g., DRAM) addressed directly by a binary machine register where a decimal interpretation makes no practical sense.

Subsequently, the Ki-, Mi-, and Gi- prefixes were introduced so that binary prefixes could be written explicitly, also rendering k, M, and G unambiguous in texts conforming to the new standard—this led to a new ambiguity in engineering documents lacking outward trace of the binary prefixes (indicating the new style) as to whether the usage of k, M, and G remains ambiguous (old style) or not (new style). 1 M (where M is ambiguously 1000000 or 1048576) is less uncertain than the engineering value 1.0×10^{6} (defined to designate the interval 950000 to 1050000). As non-volatile storage devices begin to exceed 1 GB in capacity (where the ambiguity begins to routinely impact the second significant digit), GB and TB almost always mean 10^{9} and 10^{12} bytes.

== See also ==
- Abbreviation
- Ambiguity (law)
- Ambiguity tolerance–intolerance
- Amphibology
- Decision problem
- Double entendre
- Equivocation
- Essentially contested concept
- Fallacy
- Formal fallacy
- Golden hammer
- Informal fallacy
- Pleonasm
- Semantics
- Uncertainty
- Volatility, uncertainty, complexity and ambiguity
- Word-sense disambiguation
