= Payne's grey =

Colour of paint

Color coordinates
- Hex triplet: #536878
- sRGB^{B} (r, g, b): (83, 104, 120)
- HSV (h, s, v): (206°, 31%, 47%)
- CIELCh_{uv} (L, C, h): (43, 19, 234°)
- Source: Ridgway:
- ISCC–NBS descriptor: Greyish blue
- B: Normalized to [0–255] (byte)

Payne's grey is a dark blue-grey colour used in painting. Originally a mixture of iron blue (Prussian blue), yellow ochre and crimson lake, Payne's grey now is often a mixture of blue (ultramarine, phthalocyanine, or indigo) and black, or of ultramarine and burnt sienna. The colour is named after William Payne, who painted watercolours in the late 18th century, who most likely developed the colour while trying to produce a mixer that was less intense than black. Payne's grey was deemed an obsolete term in the early 19th century, but is still used by artists today.

The first recorded use of "Payne's grey" as a colour name in English was in 1835.

The normalized colour coordinates for Payne's grey are identical to dark electric blue, which was formalized as a colour in the ISCC–NBS system in 1955.

== History ==
Payne's grey was created by the watercolourist William Payne in the late 18th century. Little is known about Payne's life, and the origins of the colour are equally as unknown. However, theories suggest that Payne made the colour in the attempts to find a replacement for black when he taught watercolour, since black was the traditional mixer.

Many different recipes of Payne's grey have existed due to the fact that the shade is a composite colour. The original mixture was made with Prussian blue, yellow ochre, and crimson lake in the late 18th century. A recipe listed in the 20th century, called for indigo instead of Prussian blue, and now it appears to be made by mixing ultramarine (natural or artificial) with a carbon-based black.

Payne's grey was described as an obsolete term for the mixture of black, ultramarine, and ochre in the early 20th century. However, this has been contradicted by other sources that suggest that the name and the colour itself are still commonly used.

== Visual Properties ==
A gradient of Payne's grey oil paint, mixed with increasing amounts of zinc white from left to right.

Payne's grey is a dark blue grey that has long been considered similar to another colour of a similar origin called neutral tint. The reason why they are similar is because both colours are made of the same pigments of indigo, ochre, and ivory black in watercolour, but in different proportions. The main difference between the two of them is that Payne's grey has a more lilac shadow, and therefore a warmer tint. Even though Payne's grey has a composition for acrylic paint, which uses a mixture of artificial ultramarine, ochre, and ivory black, its visual properties stay the same.

== Permanence ==
Payne's grey does not have significant resistance to light. Over time, the lilac shadow will fade, transforming the colour into a neutral grey.

== Notable occurrences ==
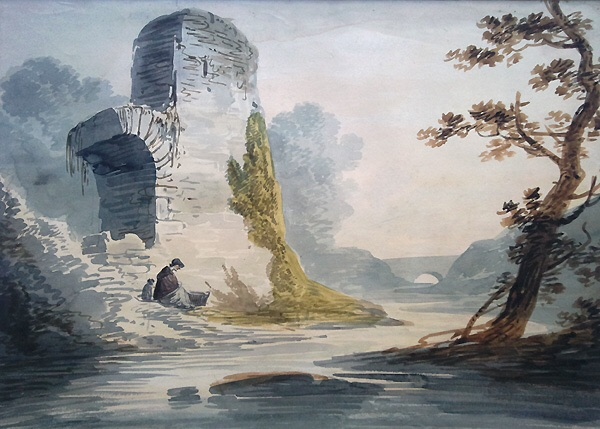
William Payne, Untitled River Scene. An example demonstrating extensive use of Payne's grey for the atmospheric effect.

A significant number of William Payne's works include the shade. The shade is primarily used for atmospheric perspective to create the impression of distance. In Payne's work, it was primarily applied to the middle distance to produce the effect.

== See also ==
- Lists of colours
