= William Payne (painter) =

English painter and etcher (1760–1830)

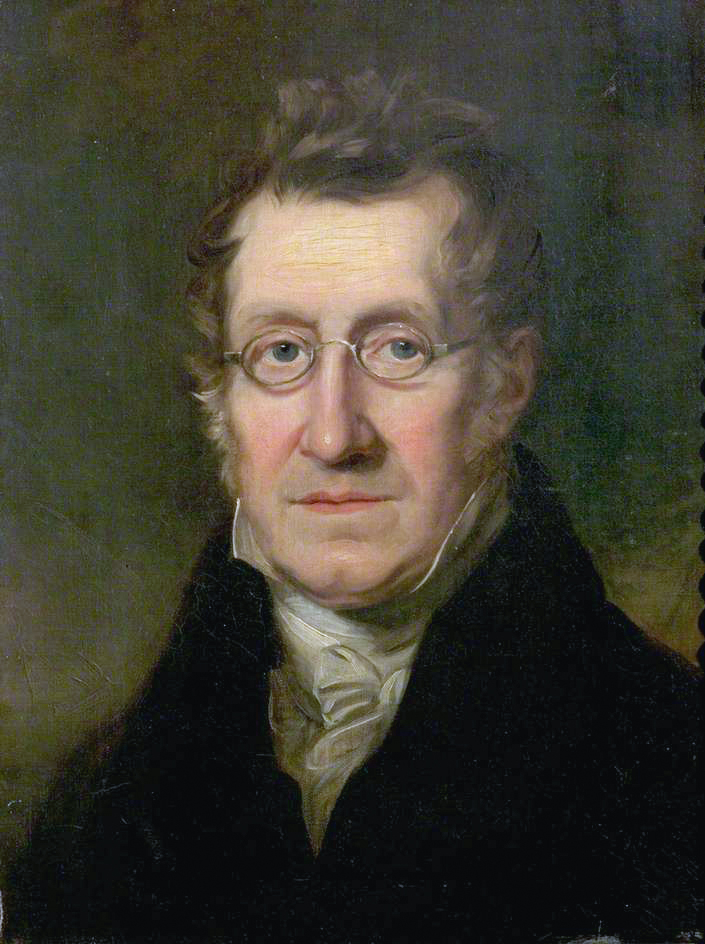
- Self-portrait, c. 1820
- Born: 4 March 1760
- Died: 1830 (aged 69–70); London, England
- Known for: Watercolour landscape; Etching; Payne's grey
- Notable work: Upon the Yealm, Devon (1791)
- Style: Watercolour landscape

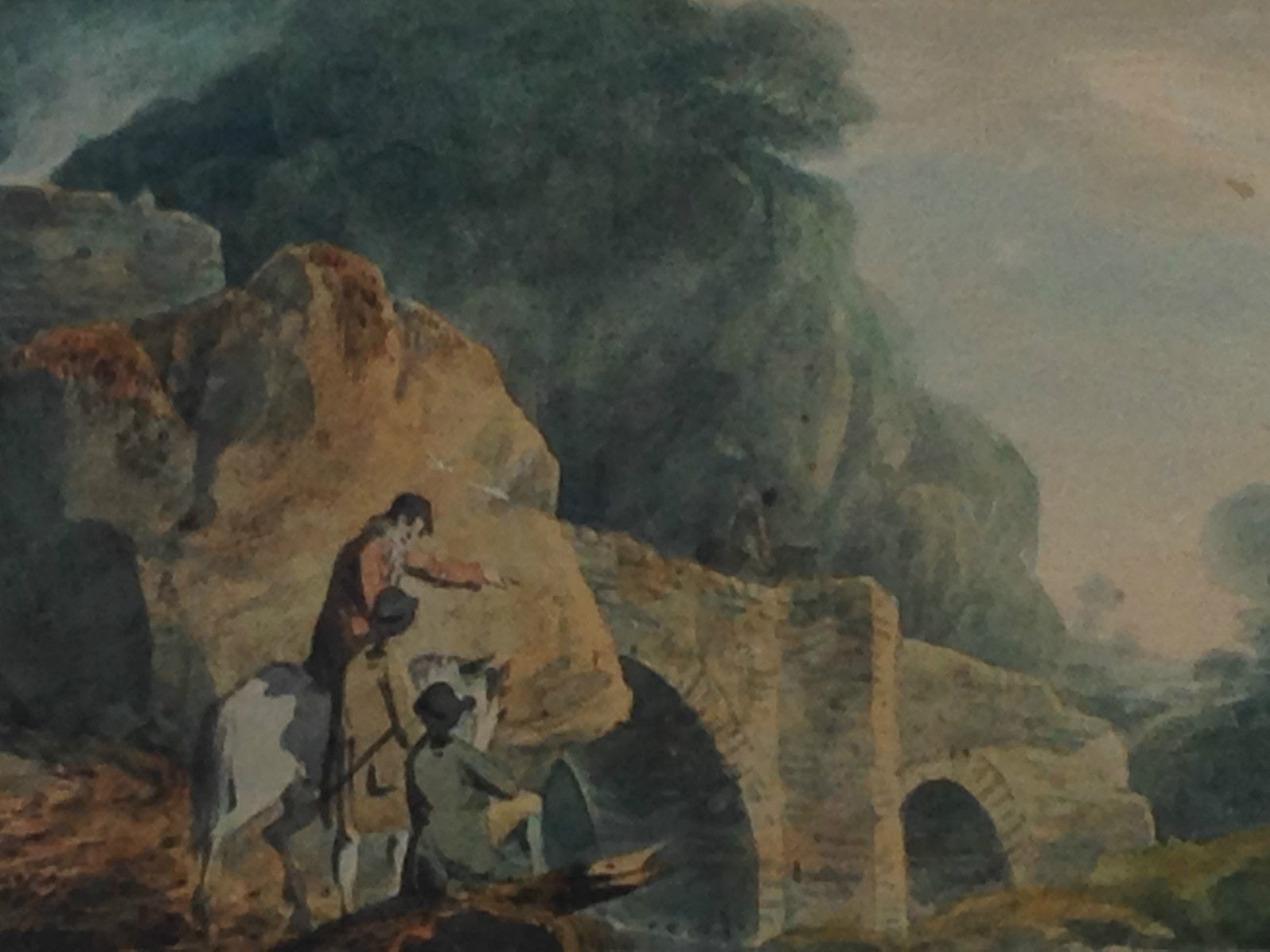
Upon the Yealm Devon, 1791, by William Payne

William Payne (4 March 1760 – August 1830) was an English painter and etcher who invented the tint Payne's grey.

== Early life ==
Payne was born on 4 March 1760.

== Career ==
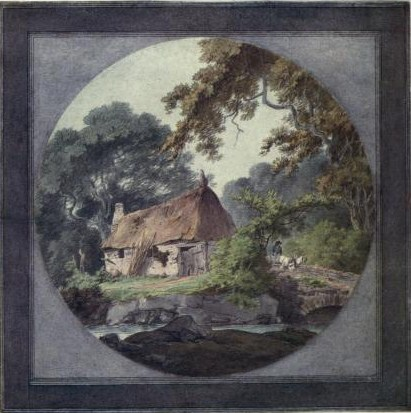
Hovel near Yalmton, Devon

Payne hit upon certain methods which considerably increased the resources of watercolour art, especially in the rendering of sunlight and atmosphere. His 'style,' as it was called, was one which was not only new and effective, but could be learnt without much difficulty, and he soon became the most fashionable drawing-master in London.

Among the innovations with which he is credited were "splitting the brush to give forms of foliage, dragging the tints to give texture to his foregrounds, and taking out the forms of lights by wetting the surface and rubbing with bread and rag". He also abandoned the use of outline with the pen, but the invention by which he is best known is a neutral tint composed of indigo, raw sienna, and lake called Payne's grey. His methods were regarded as tricky by the old-fashioned practitioners of the day, but there is no doubt that he did much to advance the technique of watercolour painting, and was one of the first 'draughtsmen' to abandon mere topography for a more poetical treatment of landscape scenery.

In 1809 he was elected an associate of the Watercolour Society, but left it after the reform of the original society in 1812. During the four years of his connection with the society he sent seventeen drawings to their exhibitions. By this time his art had changed to mannerism.

== Personal life ==
He lived at Thornhaugh Street, Bedford Square, London in 1790

== Death ==
He died in London in 1830.

== Sources ==
This article incorporates text from a publication now in the public domain: Lee, Sidney, ed. (1895). "Payne, William (fl.1800)". Dictionary of National Biography. Vol. 44. London: Smith, Elder & Co.
