= Ambiguity (law) =

Legal term

Ambiguity occurs when a single word or phrase may be interpreted in two or more ways. As law frequently involves lengthy, complex texts, ambiguity is common. Thus, courts have evolved various doctrines for dealing with cases in which legal texts are ambiguous.

== Criminal law ==
In criminal law, the rule of lenity holds that where a criminal statute is ambiguous, the meaning most favorable to the defendant—i.e., the one that imposes the lowest penalties—should be adopted. In the US context, Justice John Marshall stated the rule thus in United States v. Wiltberger:

The rule that penal laws are to be construed strictly, is perhaps not much less old than construction itself. It is founded on the tenderness of the law for the rights of individuals; and on the plain principle that the power of punishment is vested in the legislative, not in the judicial department. It is the legislature, not the Court, which is to define a crime, and ordain its punishment.

== Contract law ==
In contract law, the contra proferentem rule holds that, depending on the circumstances, ambiguous terms in a contract may be construed in favor of the party with less bargaining power.

== International law ==
In Canada, courts have developed rules of construction to interpret ambiguities in treaties between Indigenous peoples and the Crown. In 1983, the Supreme Court of Canada held that "treaties and statutes relating to Indians should be liberally construed and doubtful expressions resolved in favour of the Indians."

== Property law ==
In property law, a distinction is drawn between patent ambiguity and latent ambiguity. The two forms of ambiguity differ in two respects: (1) what led to the existence of the ambiguity; and (2) the type of evidentiary basis that might be allowed in resolving it.

=== Patent ambiguity ===
Patent ambiguity is that ambiguity which is apparent on the face of an instrument to any one perusing it, even if unacquainted with the circumstances of the parties. In the case of a patent ambiguity, parol evidence is admissible to explain only what has been written, not what the writer intended to write. For example, in Saunderson v Piper (1839), where a bill of exchange was drawn in figures for £245 and in words for two hundred pounds, evidence that "and forty-five" had been omitted by mistake was rejected. But where it appears from the general context of the instrument what the parties really meant, the instrument will be construed as if there was no ambiguity, as in Saye and Sele's case (1795), where the name of the grantor had been omitted in the operative part of a grant, but, as it was clear from another part of the grant who he was, the deed was held to be valid.

=== Latent ambiguity ===
Latent ambiguity is where the wording of an instrument is on the face of it clear and intelligible, but may, at the same time, apply equally to two different things or subject matters, as where a legacy is given "to my nephew, John," and the testator is shown to have two nephews of that name. A latent ambiguity may be explained by parol evidence: the ambiguity has been brought about by circumstances extraneous to the instrument, so the explanation must necessarily be sought in such circumstances.
