= Royal Academy Exhibition of 1830 =

1830 art exhibition in London

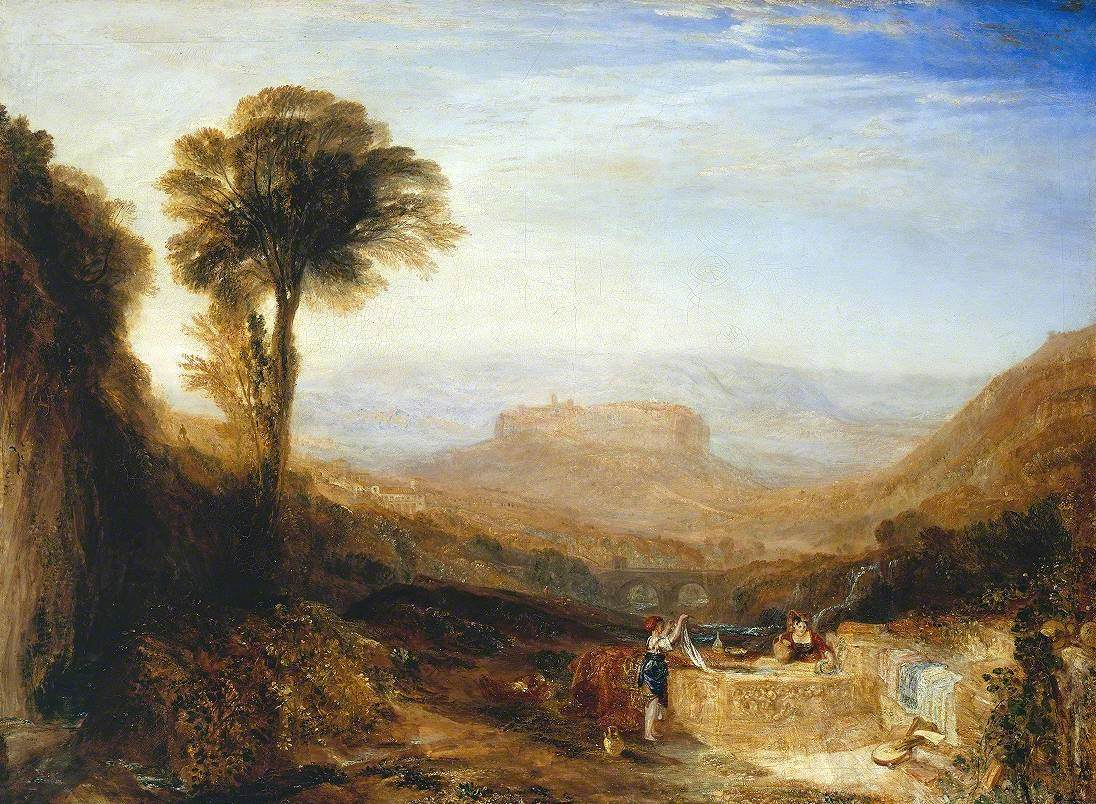
View of Orvieto by J.M.W. Turner

Royal Academy Exhibition of 1830 was an art exhibition that took place at Somerset House in London between 3 May and 24 July 1830. It was the annual Summer Exhibition of the Royal Academy of Arts. It was the last to be held during the reign of George IV who died in June while the exhibition was in progress and was succeeded by his younger brother William IV.

The President of the Royal Academy Thomas Lawrence had died suddenly in January and the Irish portraitist Martin Archer Shee was elected to succeed him. Lawrence's friend J.M.W. Turner produced a watercolor The Funeral of Sir Thomas Lawrence depicting his burial at St Paul's Cathedral which he exhibited. A number of the final works by Lawrence were posthumously exhibited to public and critical acclaim including his Portrait of Lord Aberdeen. Lawrence had dominated portraiture during the Regency era there was much press speculation about which other painters would fill his shoes.

Turner also exhibited the biblical painting Pilate Washing his Hands which met with a rough reception from critics. Likewise Jessica based on the Shakespeare character from The Merchant of Venice received very harsh reviews. Gilbert Stuart Newton displayed a more conventional version Shylock and Jessica. He also featured two landscape paintings from his recent visit to Italy. John Constable sent in several works including Helmingham Dell and a view of Hampstead Heath but his Water Meadows near Salisbury was rejected.

Scottish artist David Wilkie exhibited his The Entrance of George IV at Holyroodhouse which he has been working on since George IV's Visit to Scotland in 1822. He also displayed a portrait of George IV in Highland Dress which was very badly received. The American artist Thomas Cole made his debut at the academy and exhibited two landscapes - a depiction of the memorial to General Isaac Brock at Queenstown Heights in Canada and a View of New Hampshire. The French romantic painter Eugène Delacroix showed his The Murder of the Bishop of Liège inspired by the novel Quentin Durward by Walter Scott under the title The Boar of Ardenne.

== Gallery ==
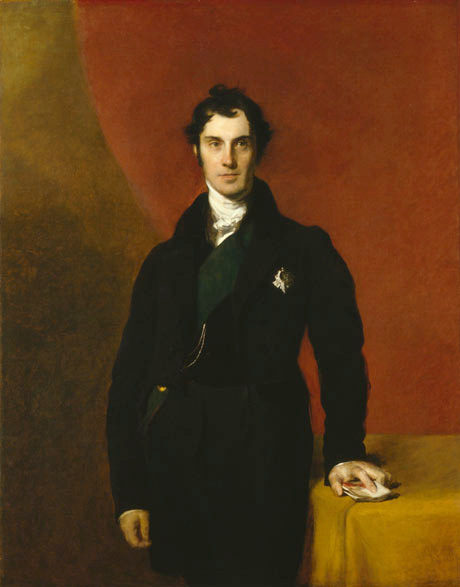
Portrait of Lord Aberdeen by Thomas Lawrence

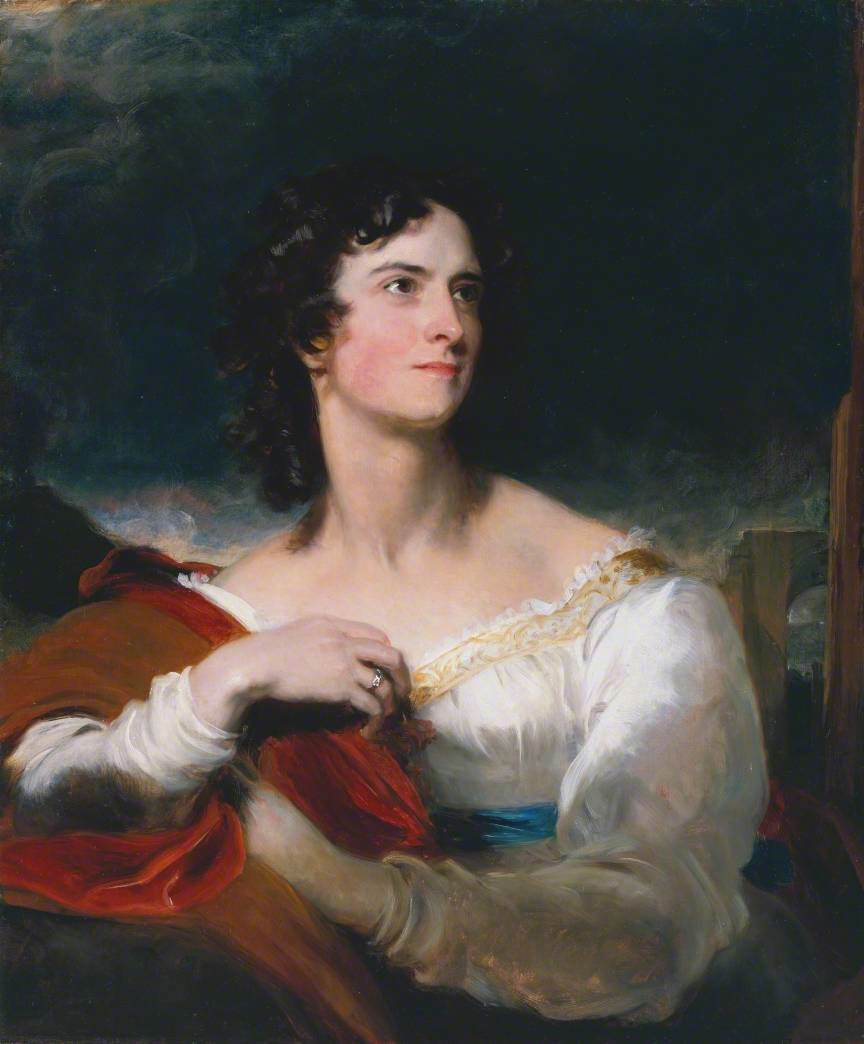
Caroline Fry by Thomas Lawrence

Portrait of the Countess of Belfast by Thomas Lawrence

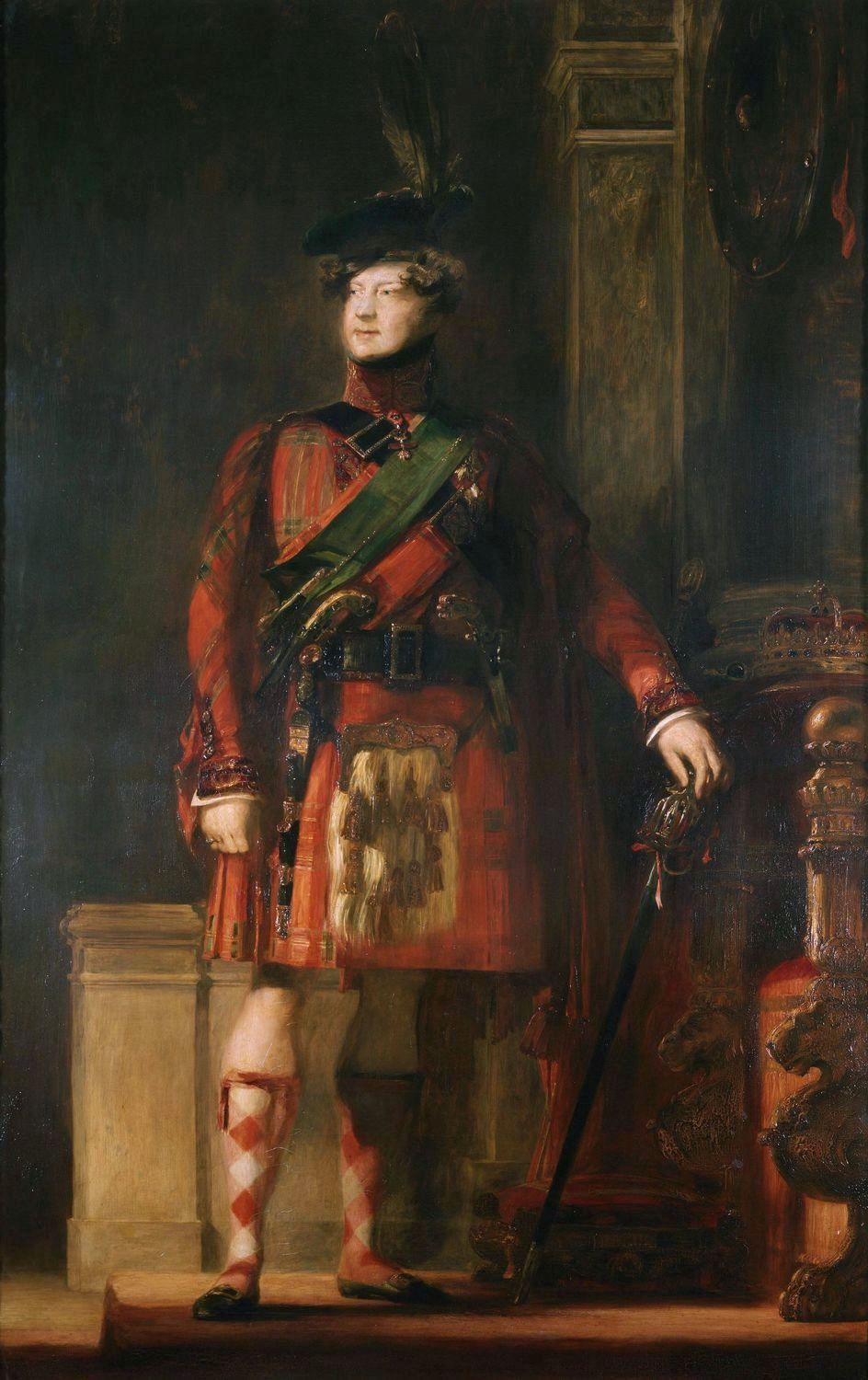
George IV in Highland Dress by David Wilkie

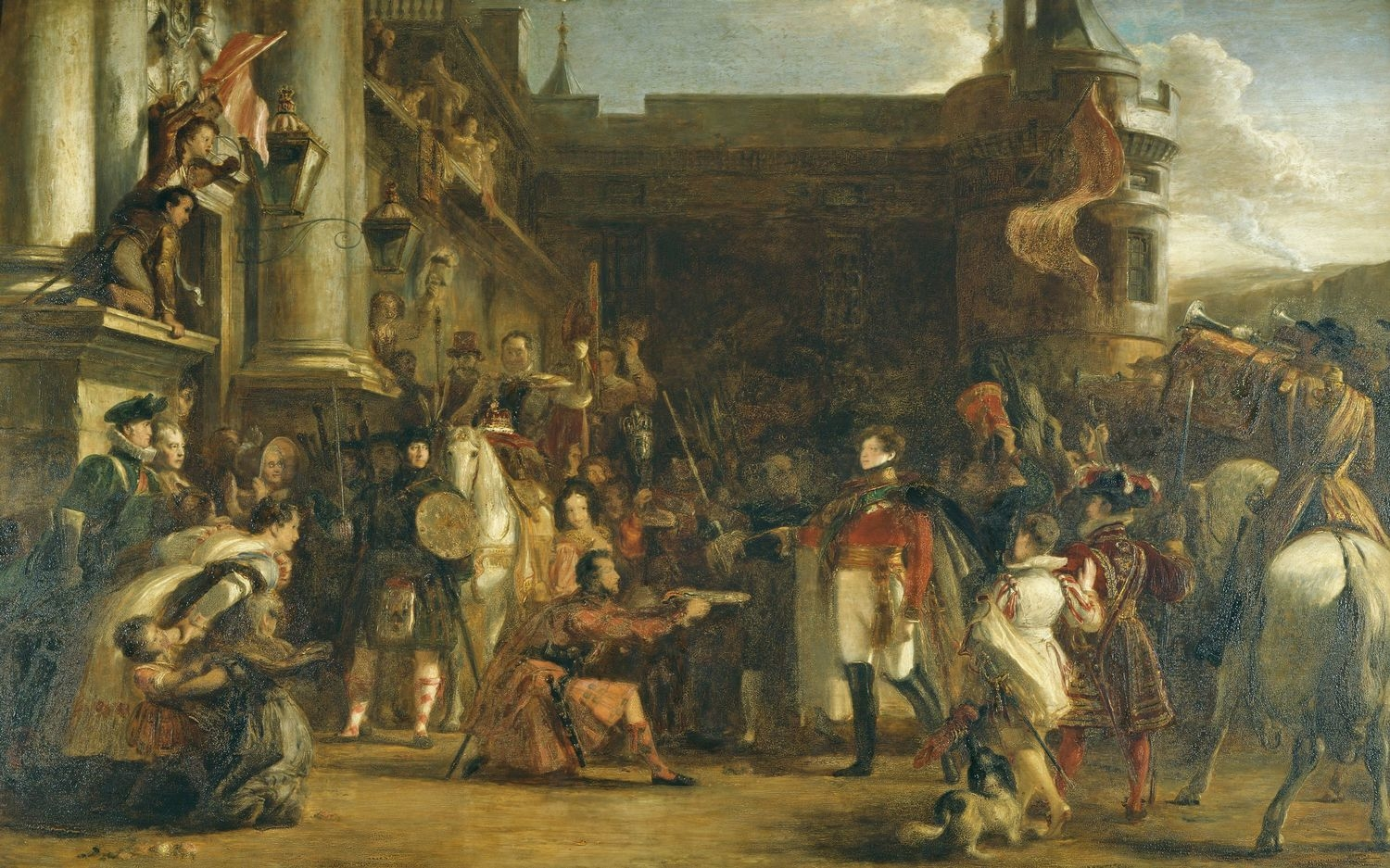
The Entrance of George IV at Holyroodhouse by David Wilkie

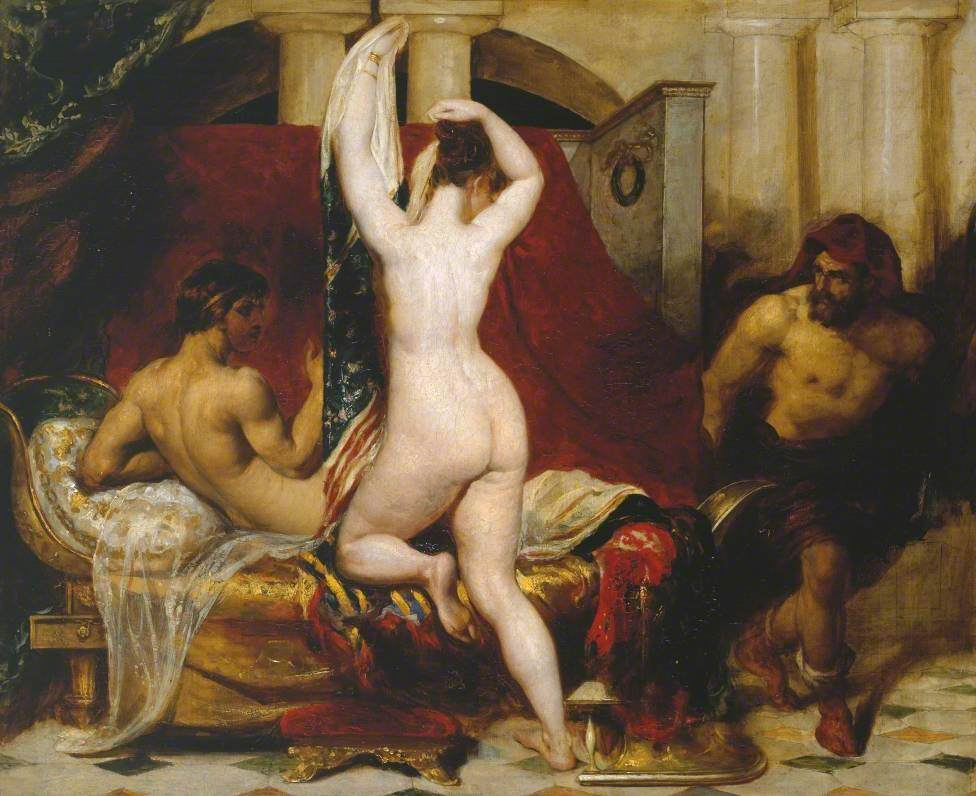
Candaules, King of Lydia, Shews his Wife by Stealth to Gyges, One of his Ministers, as She Goes to Bed by William Etty

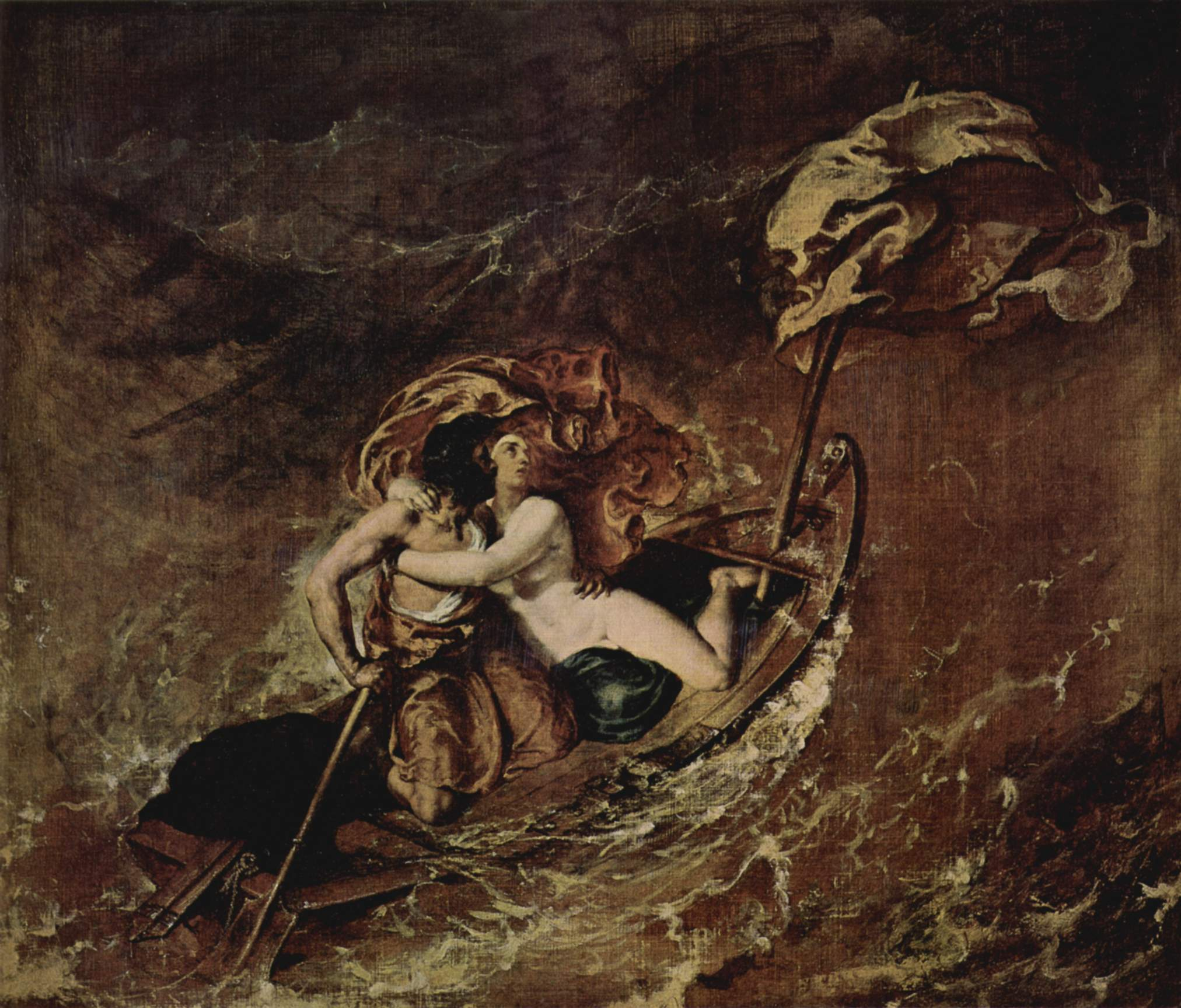
The Storm by William Etty

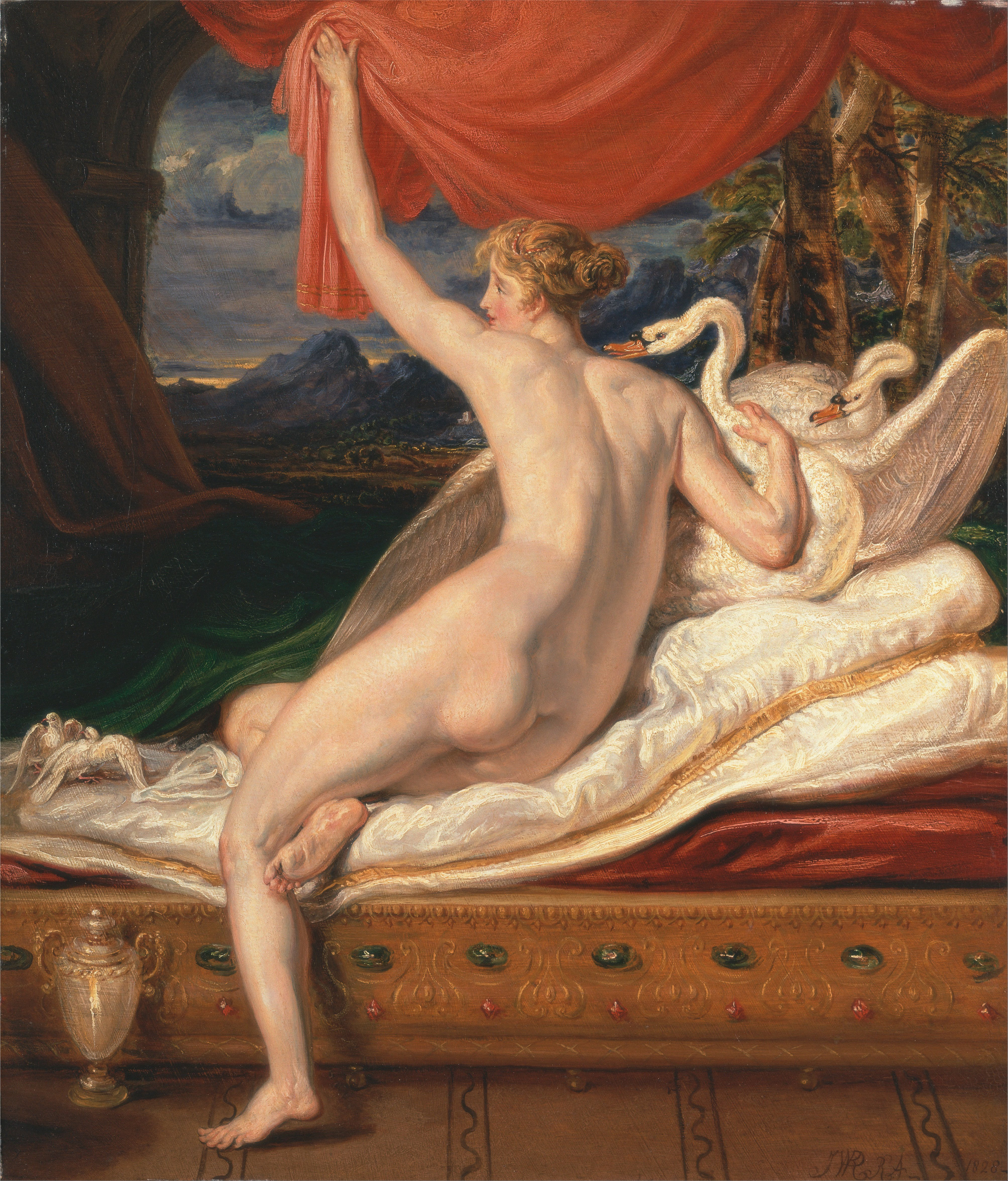
Venus Rising from her Couch by James Ward

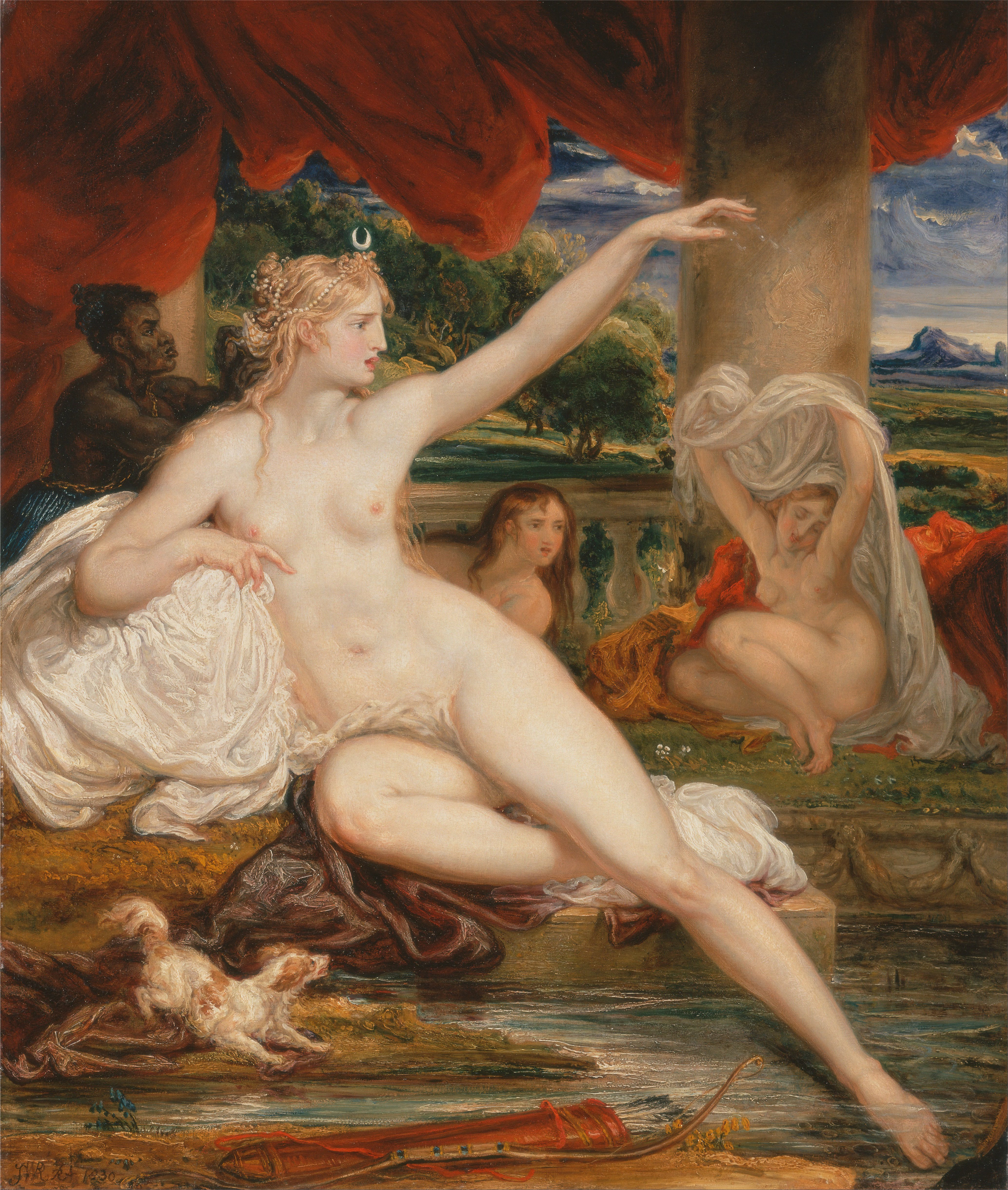
Diana at the Bath by James Ward

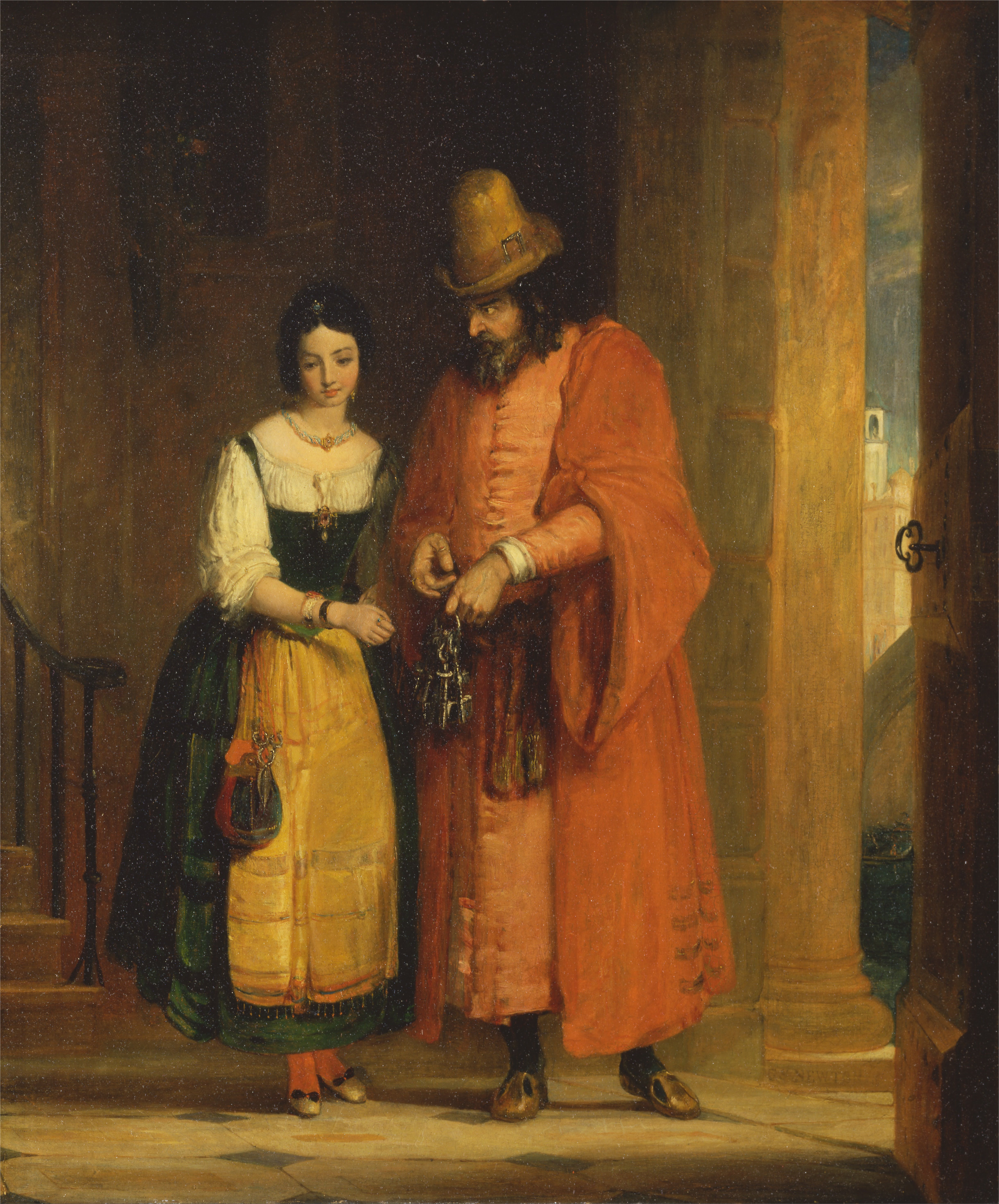
Shylock and Jessica by Gilbert Stuart Newton

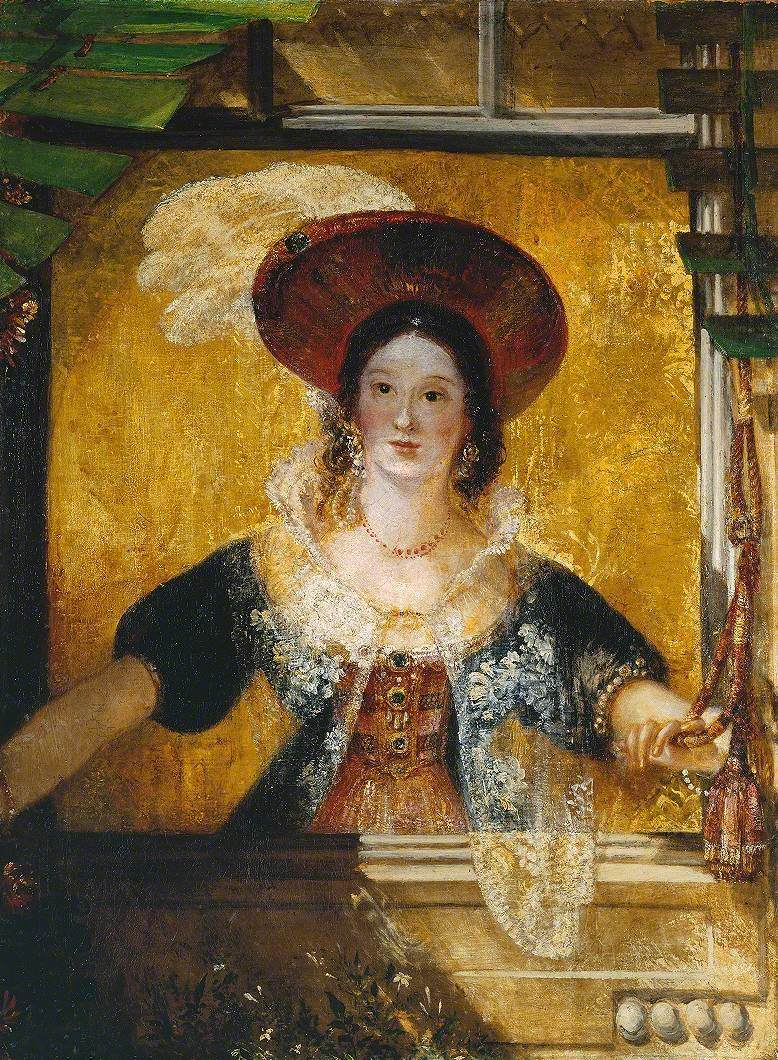
Jessica by J.M.W. Turner

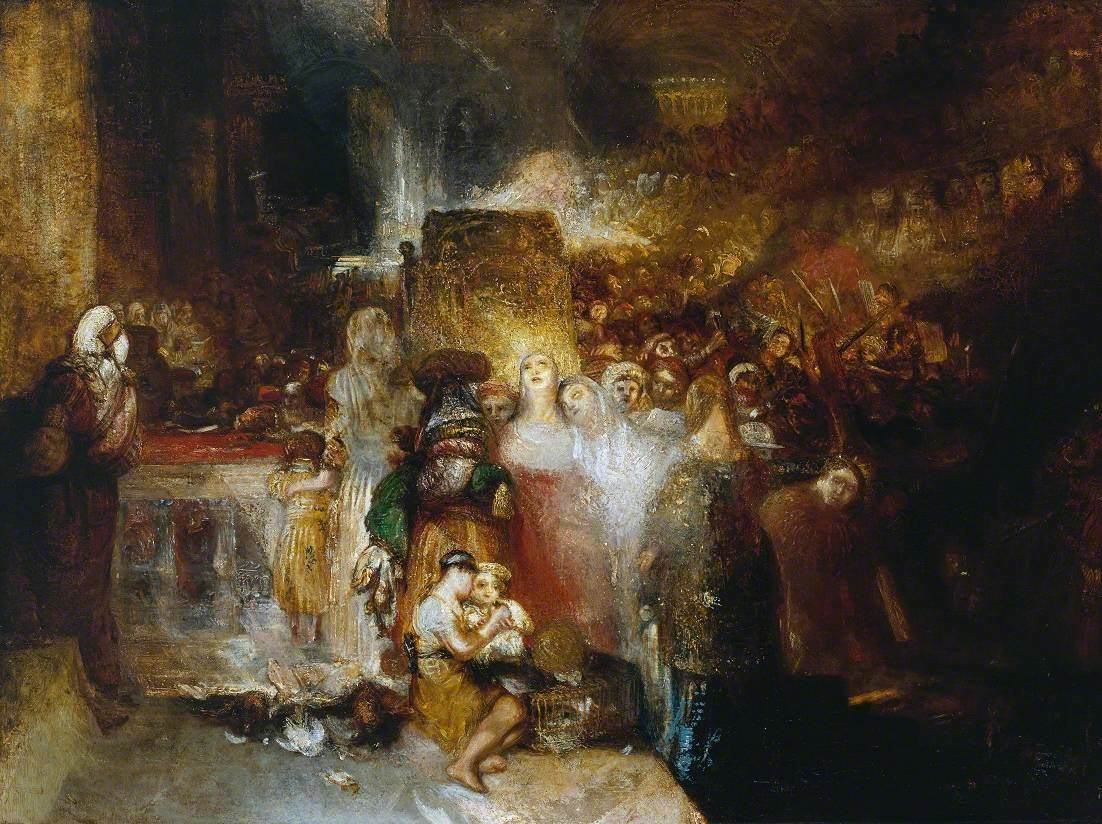
Pilate Washing his Hands by J.M.W. Turner

The Funeral of Sir Thomas Lawrence by J.M.W. Turner

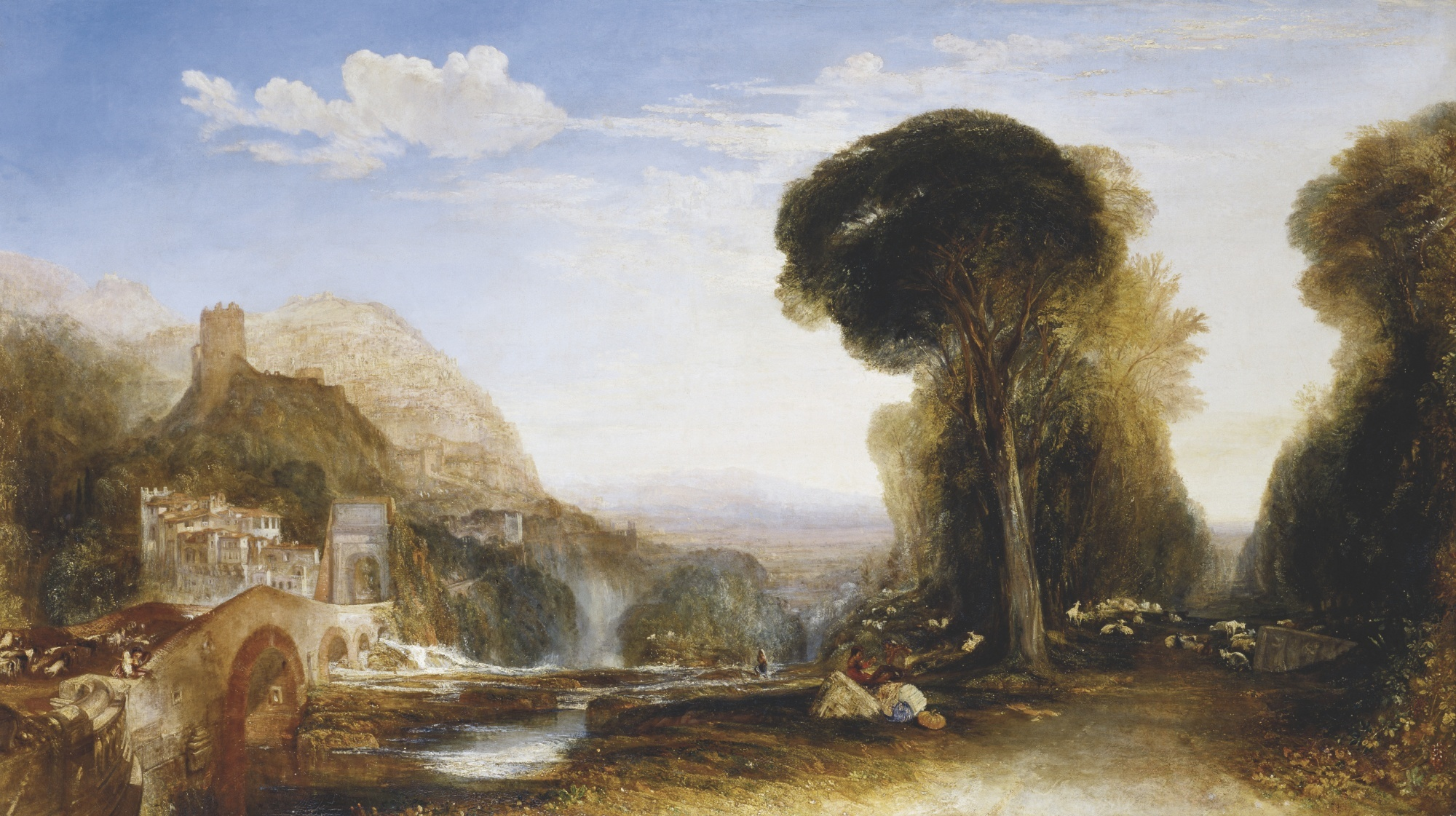
Palestrina - Composition by J.M.W. Turner

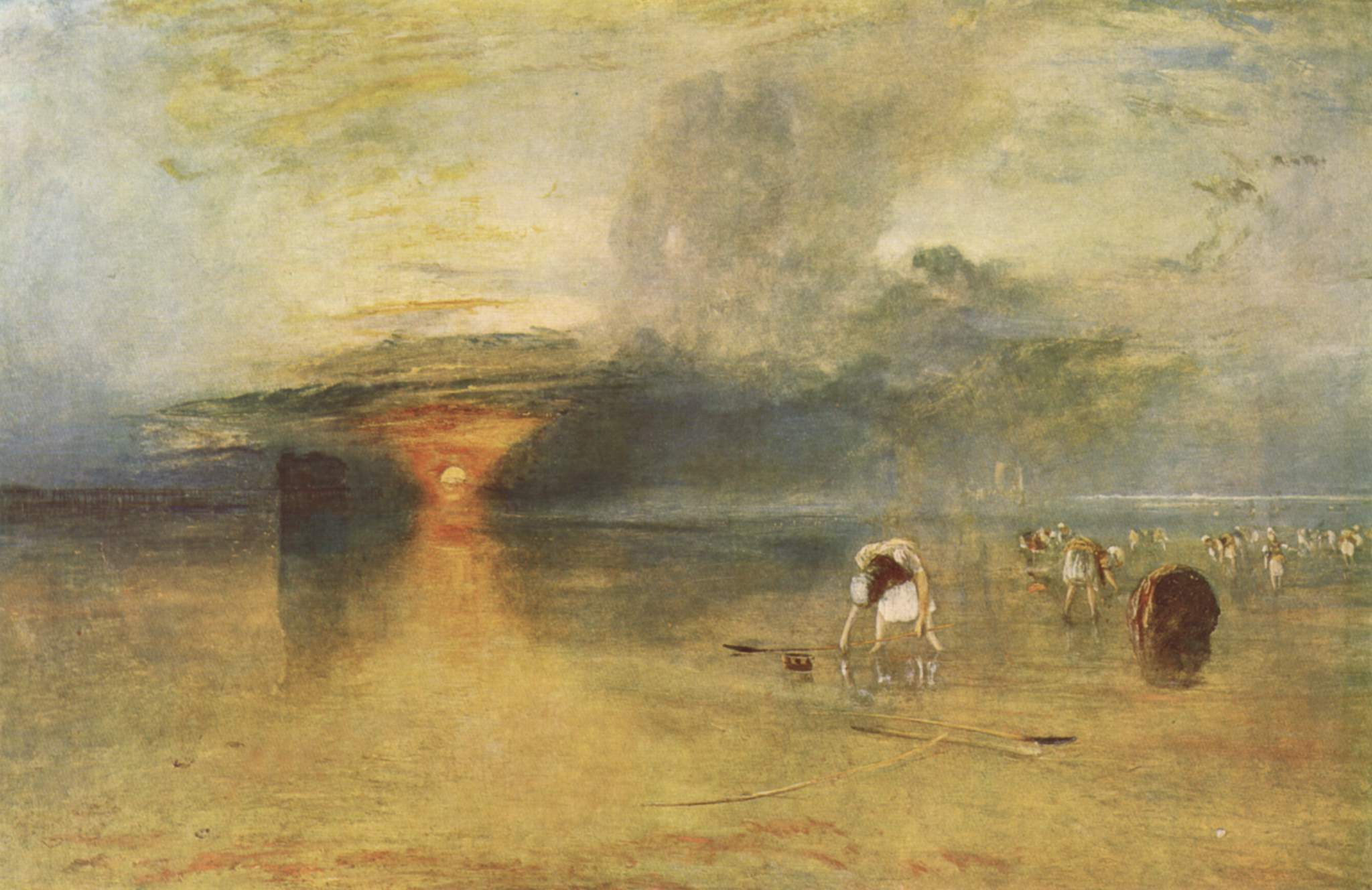
Calais Sands at Low Water by J.M.W. Turner

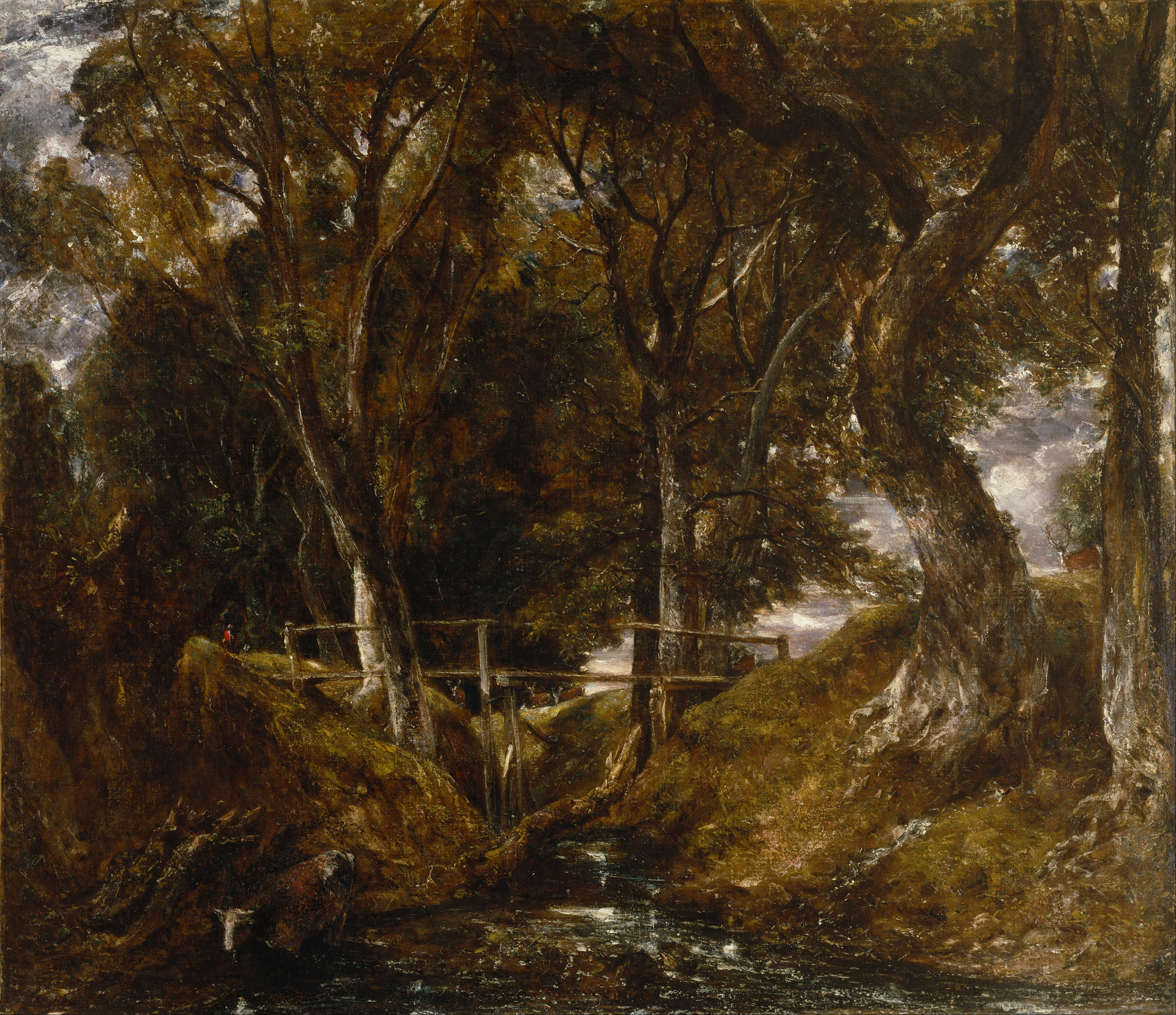
Helmingham Dell by John Constable

Water Meadows near Salisbury by John Constable

Tomb of General Brock, Queenstown Heights by Thomas Cole

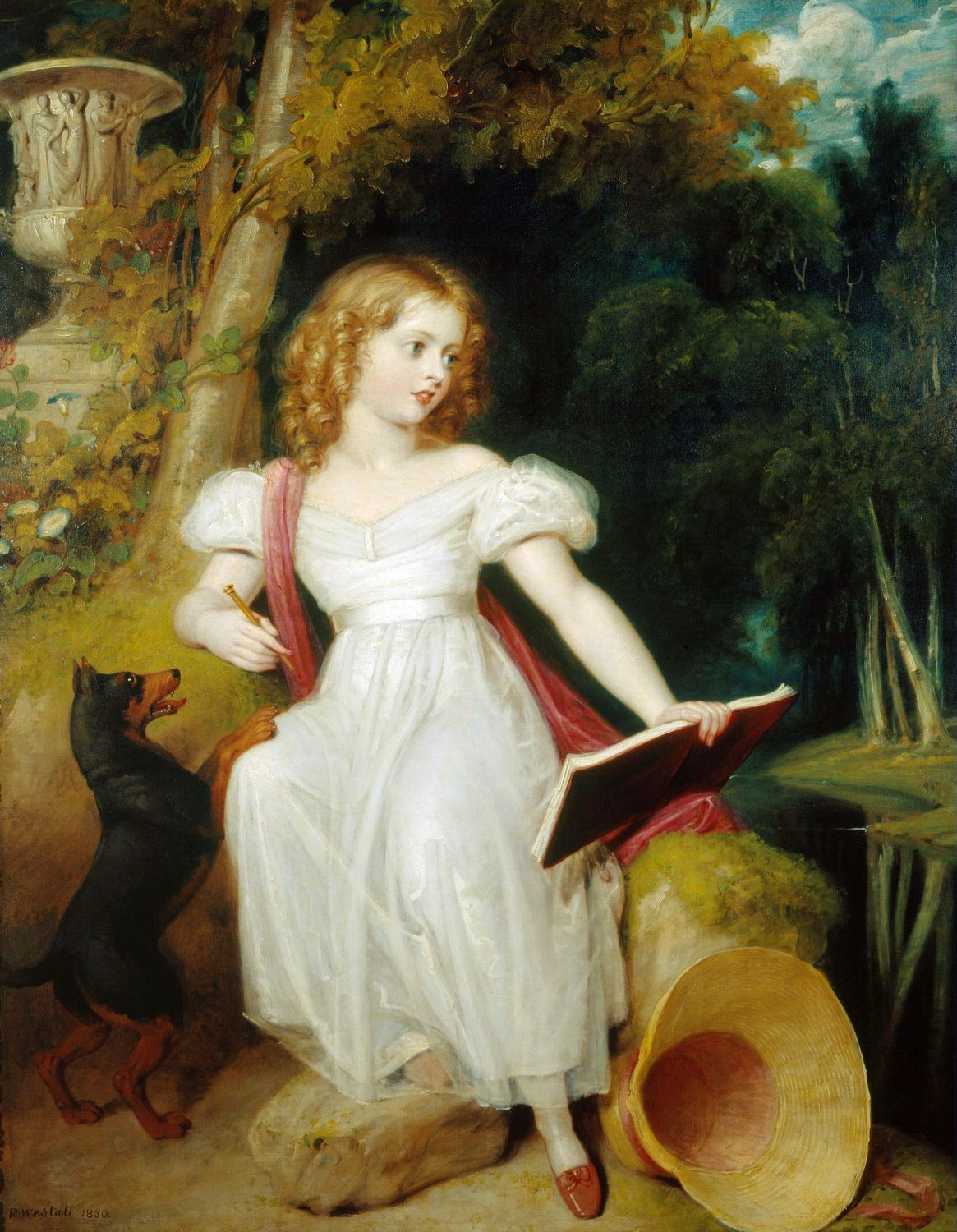
Princess Victoria by Richard Westall

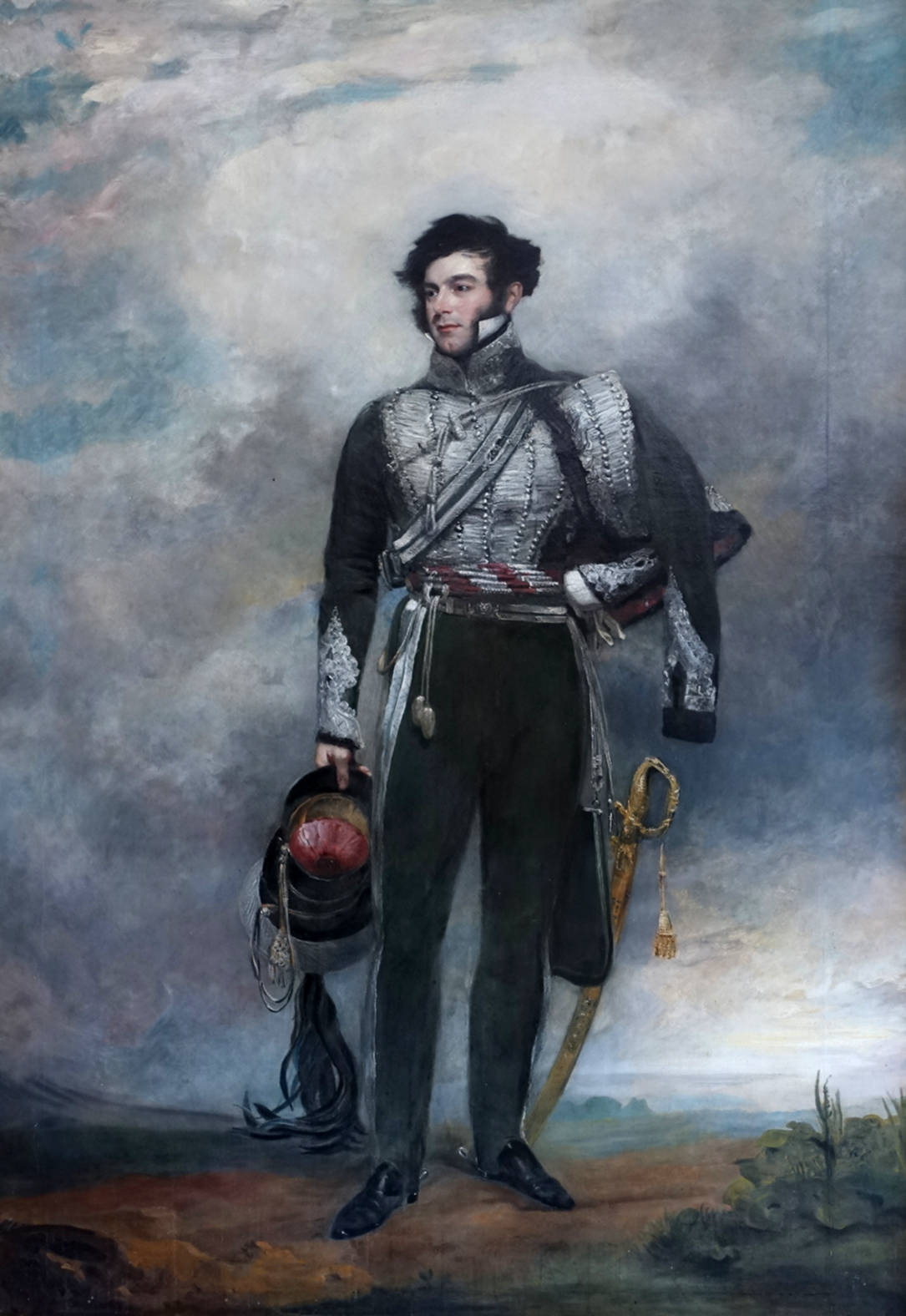
Portrait of the Duke of Chandos by John Jackson

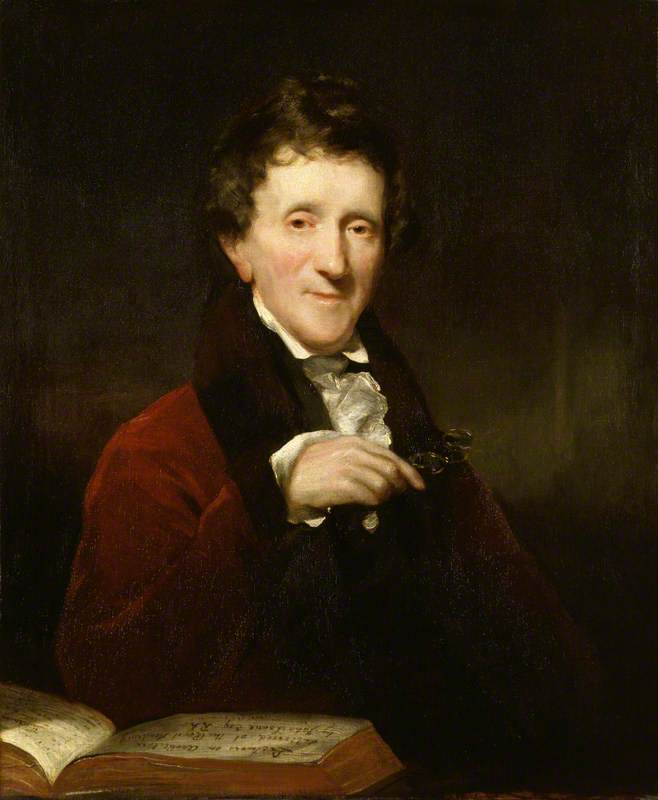
Portrait of Sir John Soane by John Jackson

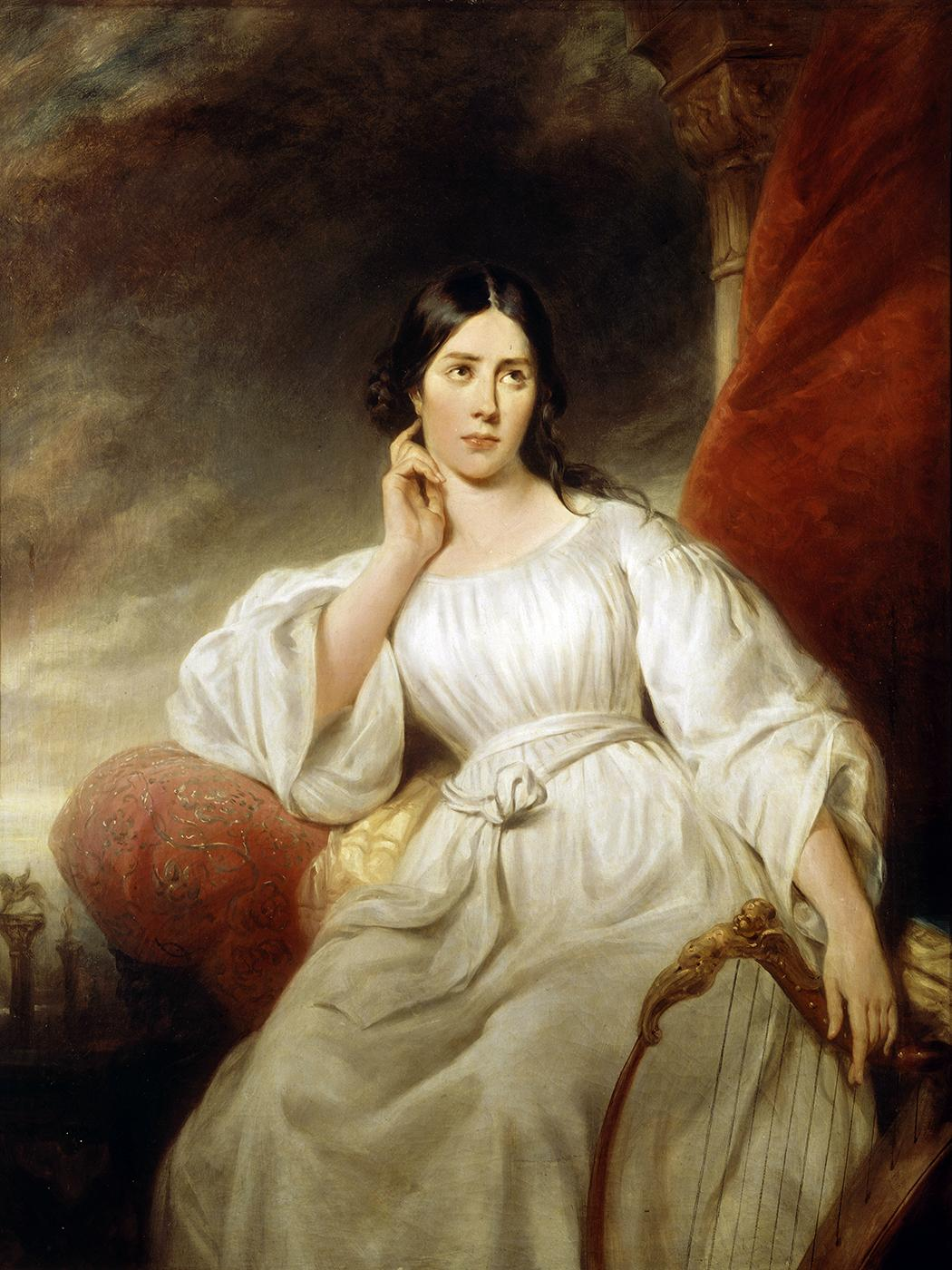
Maria Malibran as Desdemona by Henri Decaisne

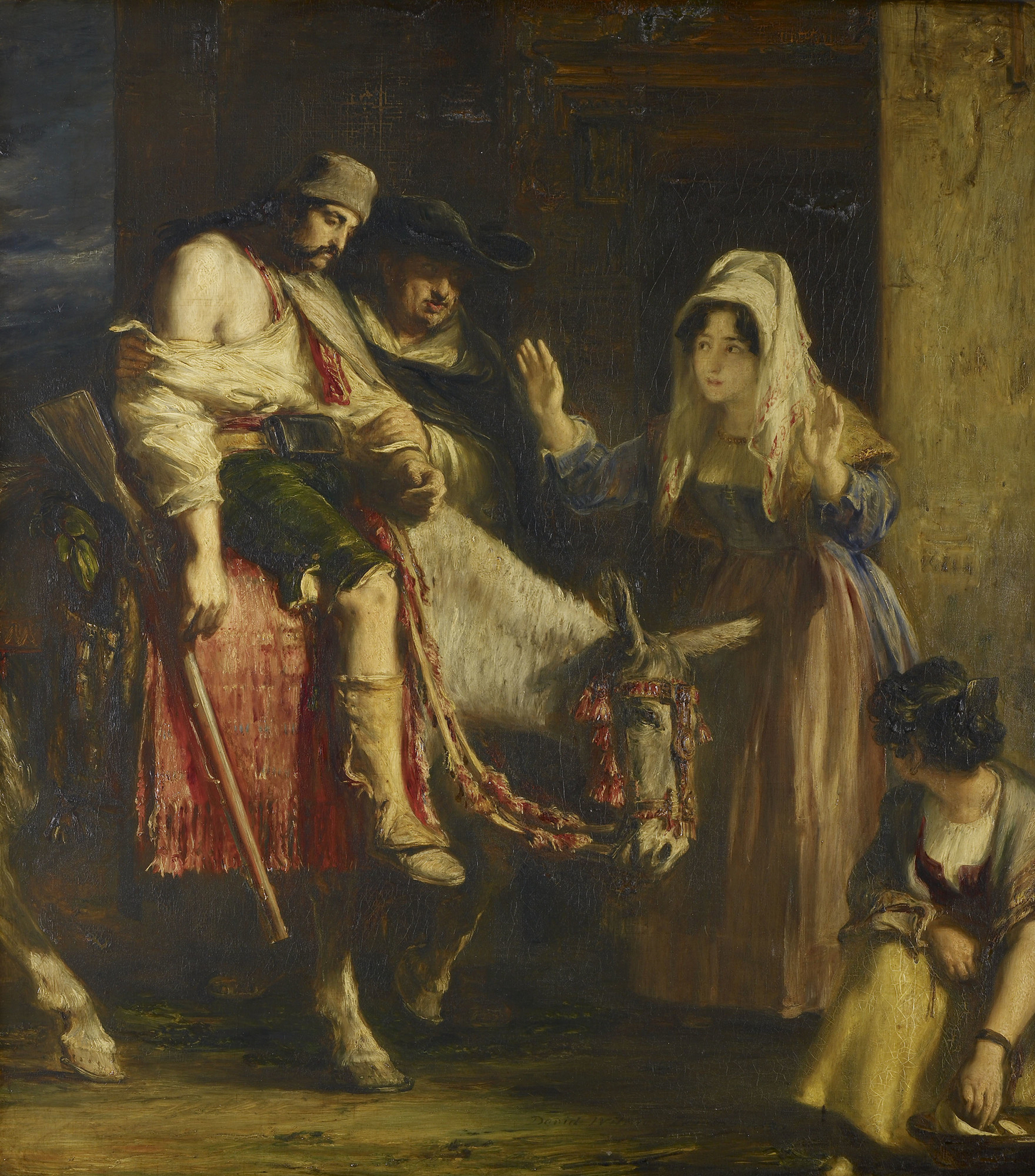
The Guerilla's Return by David Wilkie

The Passage Point by Augustus Wall Callcott

A Brisk Gale. A Dutch East-Indiaman Landing Passengers by Augustus Wall Callcott

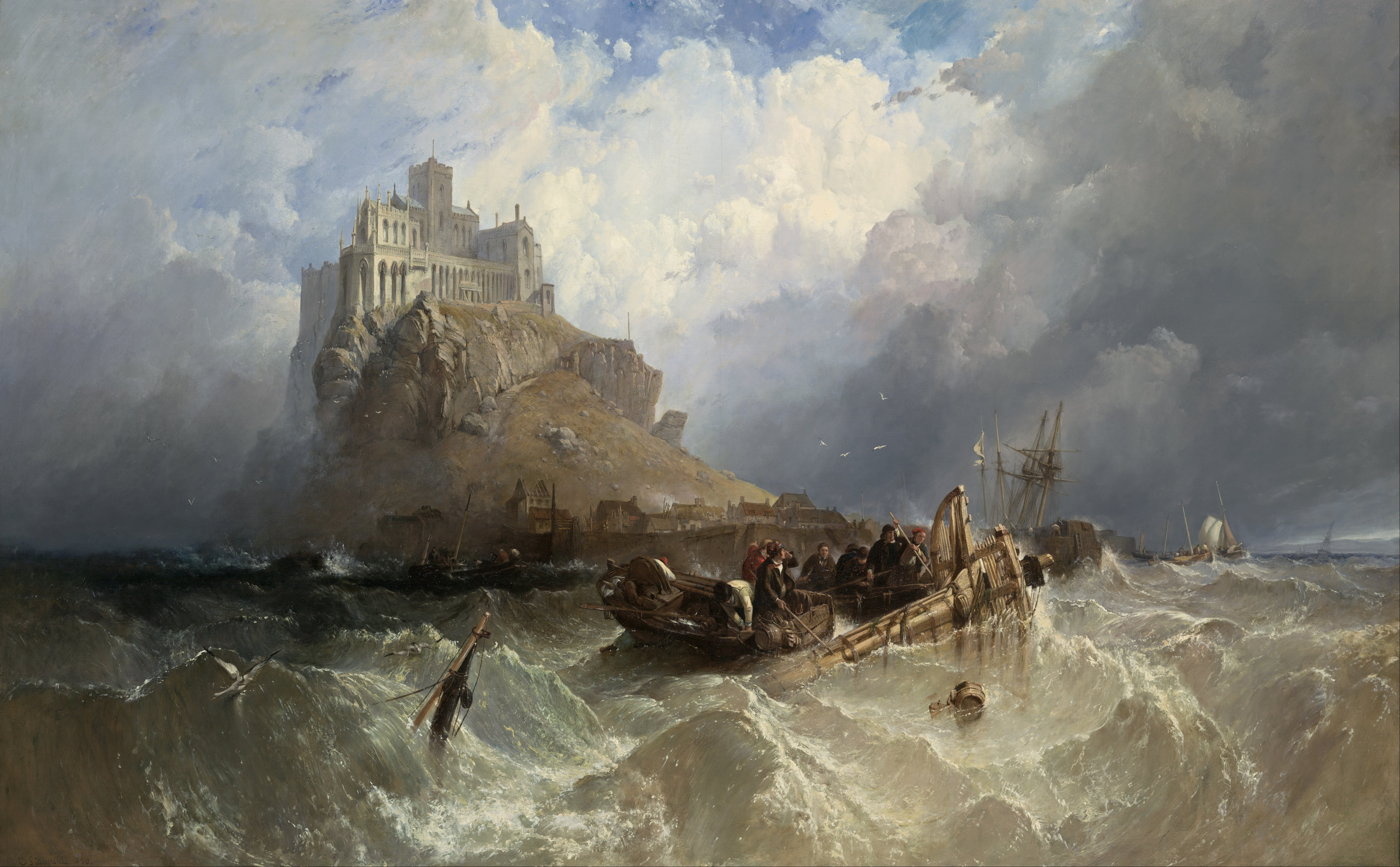
Mount St Michael, Cornwall by Clarkson Stanfield

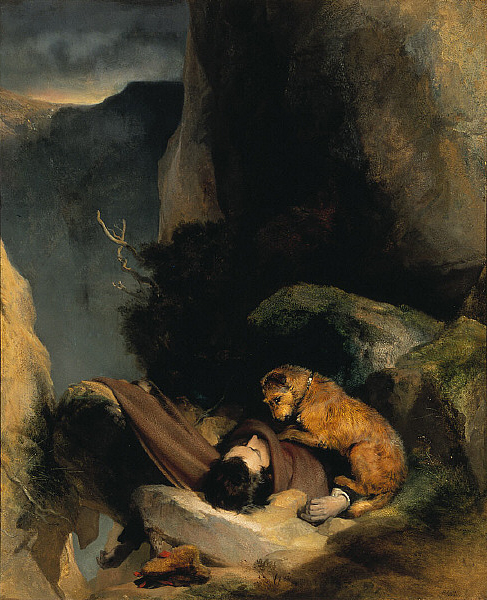
Attachment by Edwin Landseer

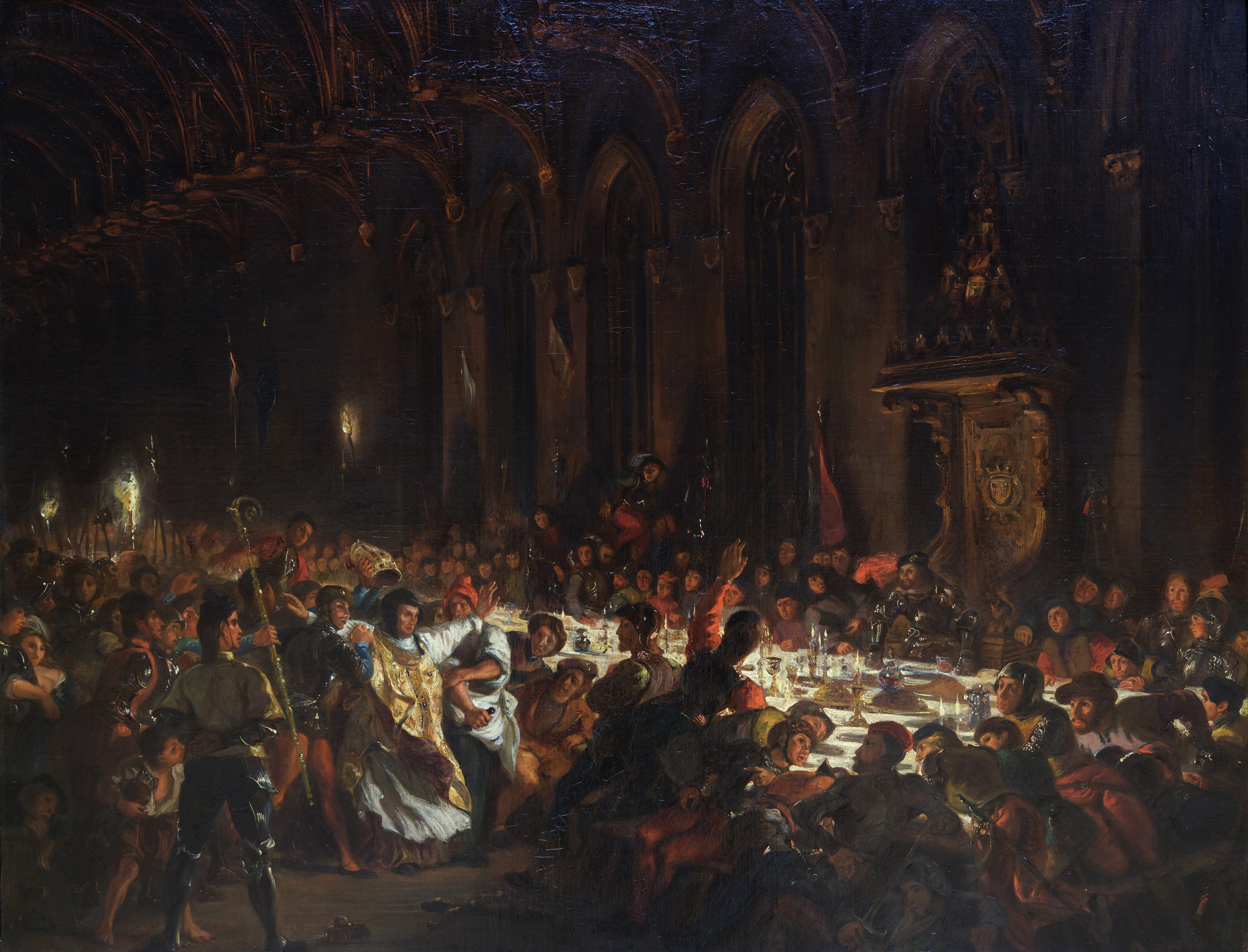
The Murder of the Bishop of Liège by Eugène Delacroix

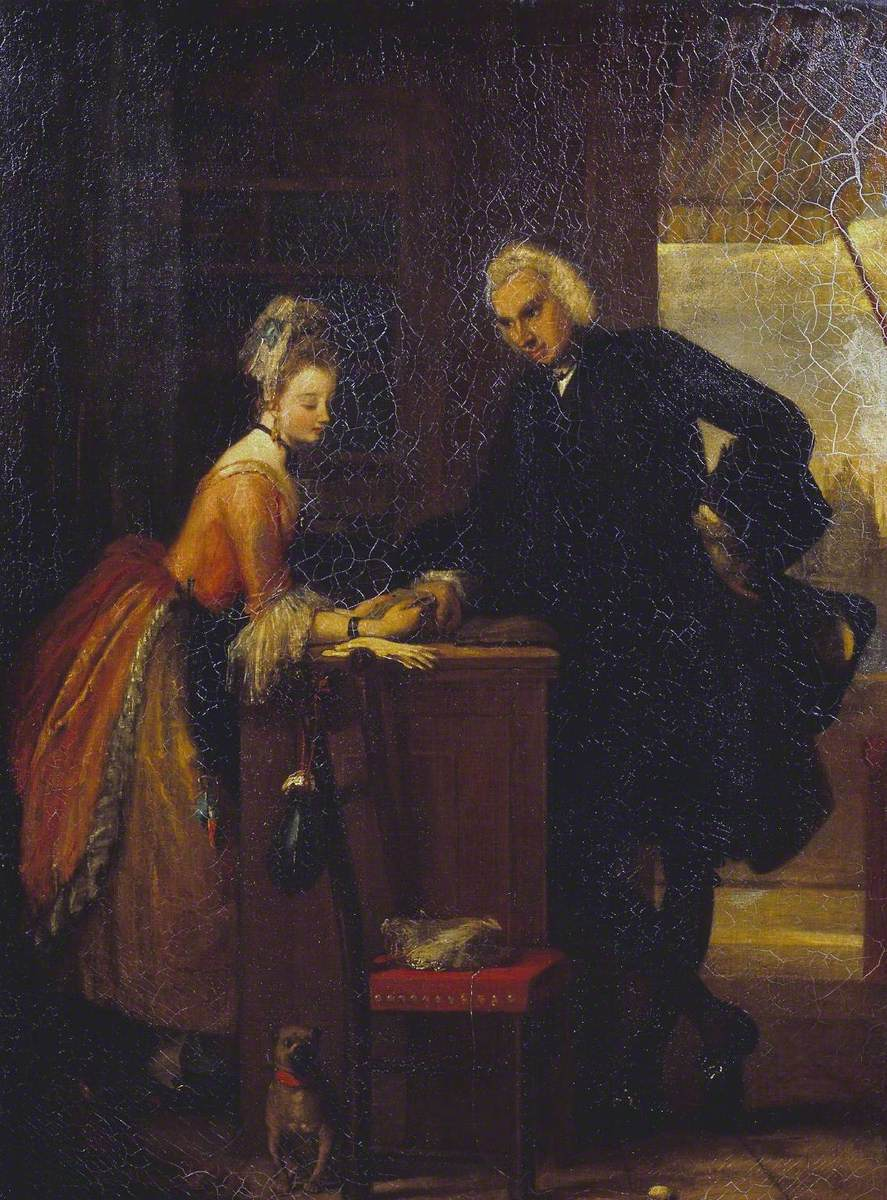
Yorick and the Grisette by Gilbert Stuart Newton

== See also ==
- Royal Academy Exhibition of 1831, the following year's exhibition
- Salon of 1831 an exhibition held at the Louvre in Paris

== Bibliography ==
- Hamilton, James. Constable: A Portrait. Hachette UK, 2022.
- Hamilton, James. Turner - A Life. Sceptre, 1998.
- Kornhauser, Elizabeth Mankin & Barringer, Tim. Thomas Cole's Journey: Atlantic Crossings. Metropolitan Museum of Art, 2018.
- Pittock, Murray. The Reception of Sir Walter Scott in Europe. Bloomsbury Publishing, 2006.
- Reynolds, Graham. Constable's England. Metropolitan Museum of Art, 1983.
- Tromans, Nicholas. David Wilkie: The People's Painter. Edinburgh University Press, 2007.
