= Jessica (Turner) =

Painting by J. M. W. Turner

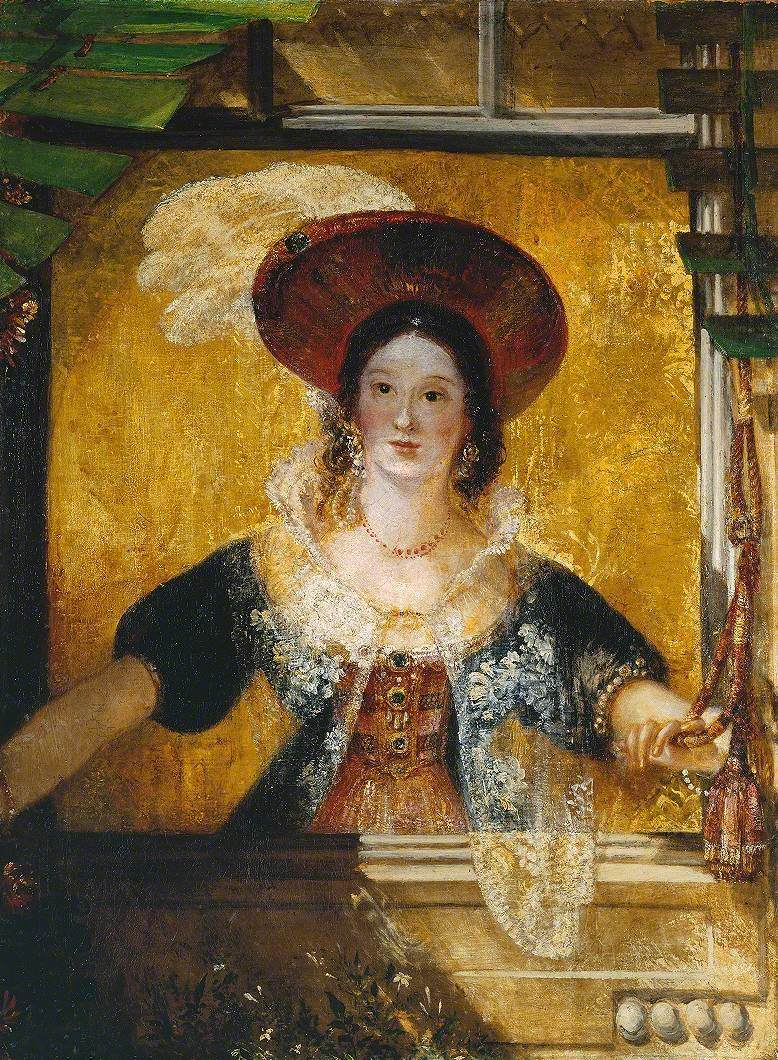
- Artist: J. M. W. Turner
- Year: 1830
- Type: Oil on canvas, genre painting
- Dimensions: 119.5 cm × 89 cm (47.0 in × 35 in)
- Location: Petworth House, Sussex

Jessica is an 1830 oil painting by the British artist J.M.W. Turner. Inspired by William Shakespeare's play The Merchant of Venice, it shows Jessica the daughter of Shylock, standing at a window in Venice. Considerable debate has taken place about whether the painting shows a strong influence of Rembrandt and which particular scene in the play it represents. Turner exhibited it with a quote that didn't appear in Shakespeare's play.

While it has been suggested Turner began the work during his stay in Rome in 1828, it is much more likely it was produced following his return to Britain. It was displayed at the Royal Academy Exhibition of 1830 held at Somerset House in London. Both it and another work Pilate Washing his Hands were particularly attacked by critics. Gilbert Stuart Newton's more conventional Shlock and Jessica, exhibited at the same time, was more widely accepted.

It was acquired by the art collector George Wyndham, 3rd Earl of Egremont in 1831. Today it remains in the collection the Earl's historic residence Petworth House, although now formally overseen by the Tate Galleries.

== Bibliography ==
- Bailey, Anthony. J.M.W. Turner: Standing in the Sun. Tate Enterprises, 2013.
- Pointon, Marcia C. Brilliant Effects: A Cultural History of Gem Stones and Jewellery
- Reynolds, Graham. Turner. Thames and Hudson, 2022.
