= The Entrance of George IV at Holyroodhouse =

Painting by David Wilkie

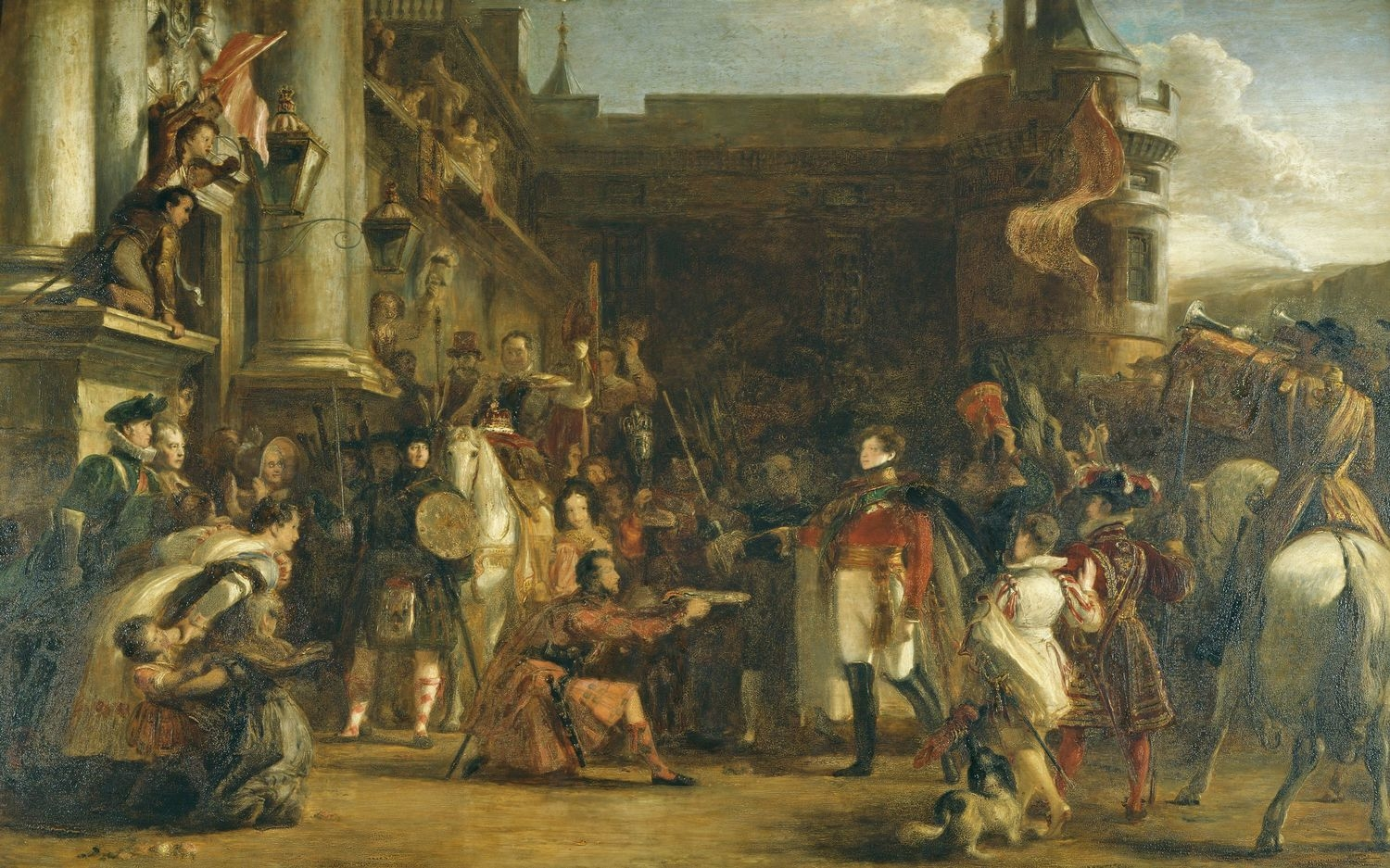
- Artist: David Wilkie
- Year: 1830
- Type: Oil on canvas, history painting
- Dimensions: 126 cm × 198.1 cm (50 in × 78.0 in)
- Location: Holyroodhouse, Edinburgh

The Entrance of George IV at Holyroodhouse is an 1830 history painting by the British artist David Wilkie. It depicts a moment from the Visit of George IV to Scotland. It depicts the moment the George IV arrived at the Palace of Holyroodhouse in Edinburgh on 15 August 1822. The King is shown in the uniform of a Field Marshal of the British Army and wearing the Order of the Thistle and is greeted by the Duke of Hamilton, who formally presents him with the keys to the palace, and Duke of Montrose who gestures towards the entrance. The Duke of Argyll stands nearby in Highland dress beside close to a horse bearing the Honours of Scotland. Others present are the Sir Alexander Keith, the Knight Marischal, Lord Francis Leveson-Gower and Earl of Morton.

The visit was choreographed by Walter Scott (shown to the left of the painting) the first by a reigning British monarch for many years. Wilkie was present during the King's trip and produced a number of sketches in preparation for his commission from George IV but couldn't settle on a subject. It was the king himself who selected his "admission to the palace of his ancestors, with all the chiefs of the North on his right and left".

The visit was a popular success. Wilkie's contemporary J.M.W. Turner had also travelled to Edinburgh to sketch the scene, possibly in the hope of securing his own royal commission, but abandoned his planned series of oil paintings unfinished with George IV at St Giles's, Edinburgh the nearest to completion.

The picture took many years to finish. During the mid-1820s Wilkie had a breakdown stopped painting and toured Continental Europe which gradually rekindled his enthusiasm for art and he produced a number of Spanish- inspired paintings.The work was finally displayed at the Royal Academy Exhibition of 1830 at Somerset House in London, along with a portrait by Wilkie George IV in Highland Dress that also commemorated the visit. Ironically, he king died during the exhibition to be succeeded by his younger brother William IV. The paintings received a mixed to hostile reception from critics.

George IV had paid Wilkie 1600 guineas for the work. By 1841 it was displayed in the Picture Gallery of Buckingham Palace. Today the painting remains in the Royal Collection, hanging at the Great Stair of Holyroodhouse.

== Bibliography ==
- Clarke, Deborah & Remington, Vanessa. Scottish Artists 1750-1900: From Caledonia to the Continent. Royal Collection Trust, 2015.
- Tromans, Nicholas. David Wilkie: The People's Painter. Edinburgh University Press, 2007.
