= Palestrina - Composition =

Painting by J. M. W. Turner

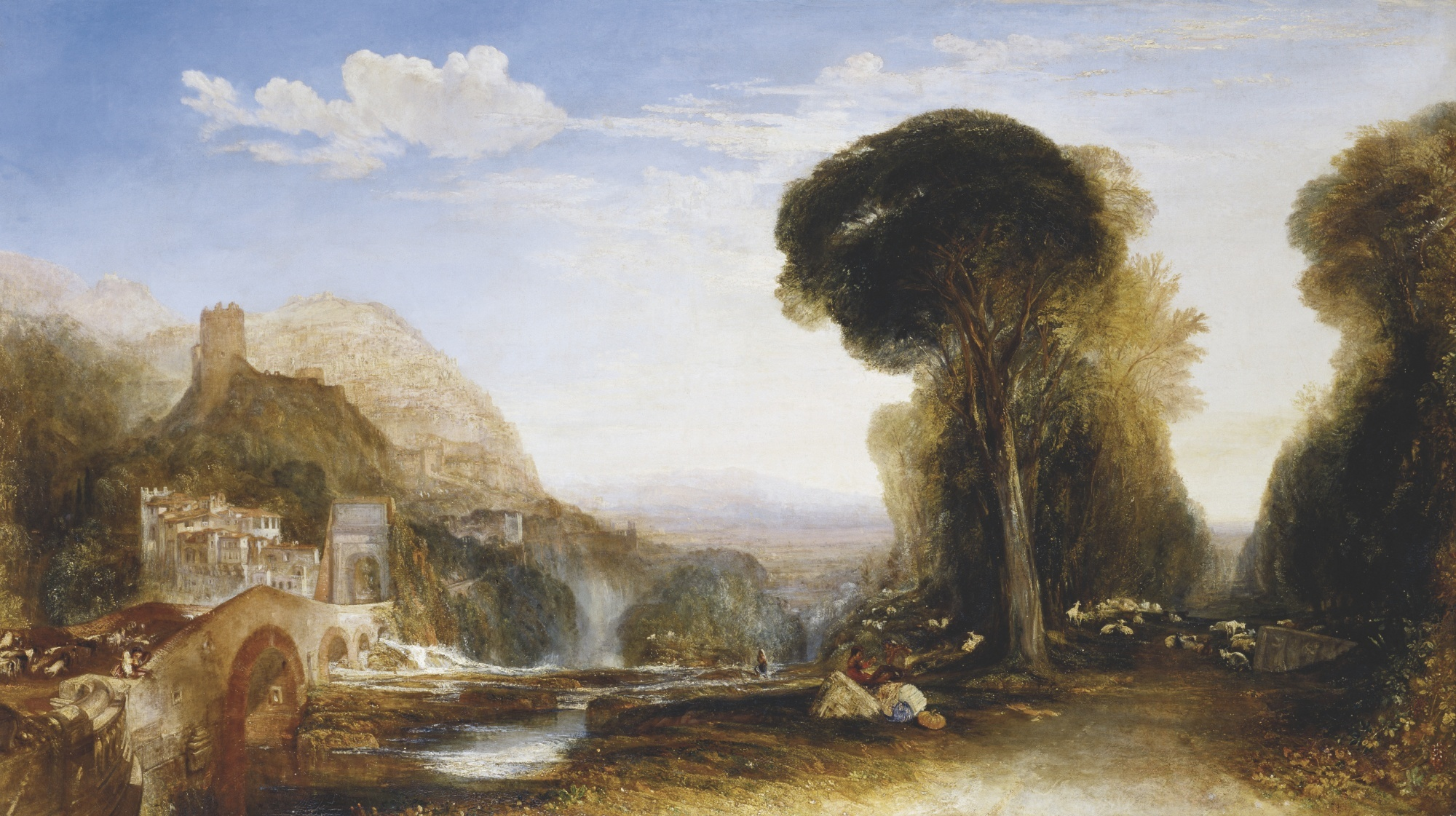
- Artist: J. M. W. Turner
- Year: 1828
- Type: Oil on canvas, landscape painting
- Dimensions: 140.3 cm × 248.9 cm (55.2 in × 98.0 in)
- Location: Tate Britain, London

Palestrina - Composition is an 1828 landscape painting by the British artist J.M.W. Turner featuring a view of the town of Palestrina in Lazio, east of Rome. On the left, beyond the bridge, the buildings slope along the hilltop while the right features an avenue of trees with grazing sheep.

Turner travelled to Italy that year for his second major visit. While in Rome this is one of several paintings Turner exhibited in his studio. The work was then displayed at the Royal Academy Exhibition of 1830 at Somerset House in London. Turner envisioned the work as one that would interest the aristocratic art collector the Earl of Egremont for his country estate Petworth House. In the event Egremont did not purchase it and the picture was acquired a number of years later by the whaling magnate Elhanan Bicknell Today the painting is in the collection of the Tate Britain, having been bequeathed in 1958.

== See also ==
- List of paintings by J. M. W. Turner

== Bibliography ==
- Bailey, Anthony. J.M.W. Turner: Standing in the Sun. Tate Enterprises, 2013.
- Finley, Gerald. Angel in the Sun; Turner's Vision of History. McGill-Queen's University Press, 1999.
- Hamilton, James (ed.) Turner and Italy. National Galleries of Scotland, 2009.
- Reynolds, Graham. Turner. Thames & Hudson, 2022.
- Solkin, David. Turner and the Masters. Harry N. Abrams, 2009.
