= The Faithful Hound =

Painting by Edwin Landseer

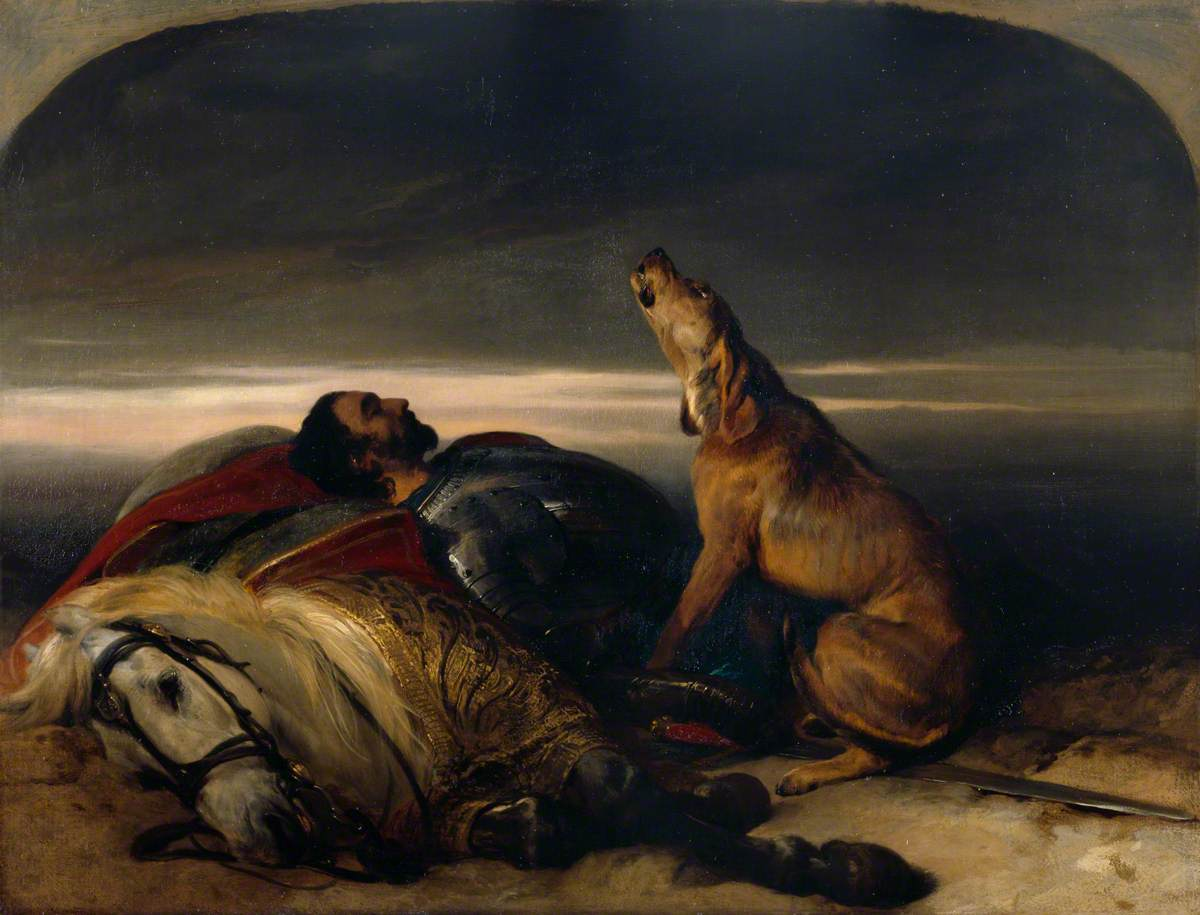
- Artist: Edwin Landseer
- Year: 1830
- Type: Oil on canvas, genre painting
- Dimensions: 68.4 cm × 91.2 cm (26.9 in × 35.9 in)
- Location: Royal Academy of Arts; London

The Faithful Hound is an 1830 oil painting by the British artist Edwin Landseer. It depicts a faithful dog, howling in mourning over the corpse of his master, a knight in armour who has been slain in battle. Romantic in style, it was one of several works Landseer produced featuring a dog's attachment to man including Attachment (1830) and The Old Shepherd's Chief Mourner (1837).

Landseer presented it as his diploma work when he was elected to membership of the Royal Academy of Arts in 1831 and it remains in their collection. In 1874 it featured in a retrospective of his works held by the Royal Academy at Burlington House.

== Bibliography ==
- Broglio, Ron. Beasts of Burden: Biopolitics, Labor, and Animal Life in British Romanticism. State University of New York Press, 2017.
- Noakes, Aubrey. Sportsmen in a Landscape. Bodley Head, 1954.
- Ormond, Richard. Sir Edwin Landseer. Philadelphia Museum of Art, 1981.
