= The Murder of the Bishop of Liège =

1828/29 painting by Eugène Delacroix

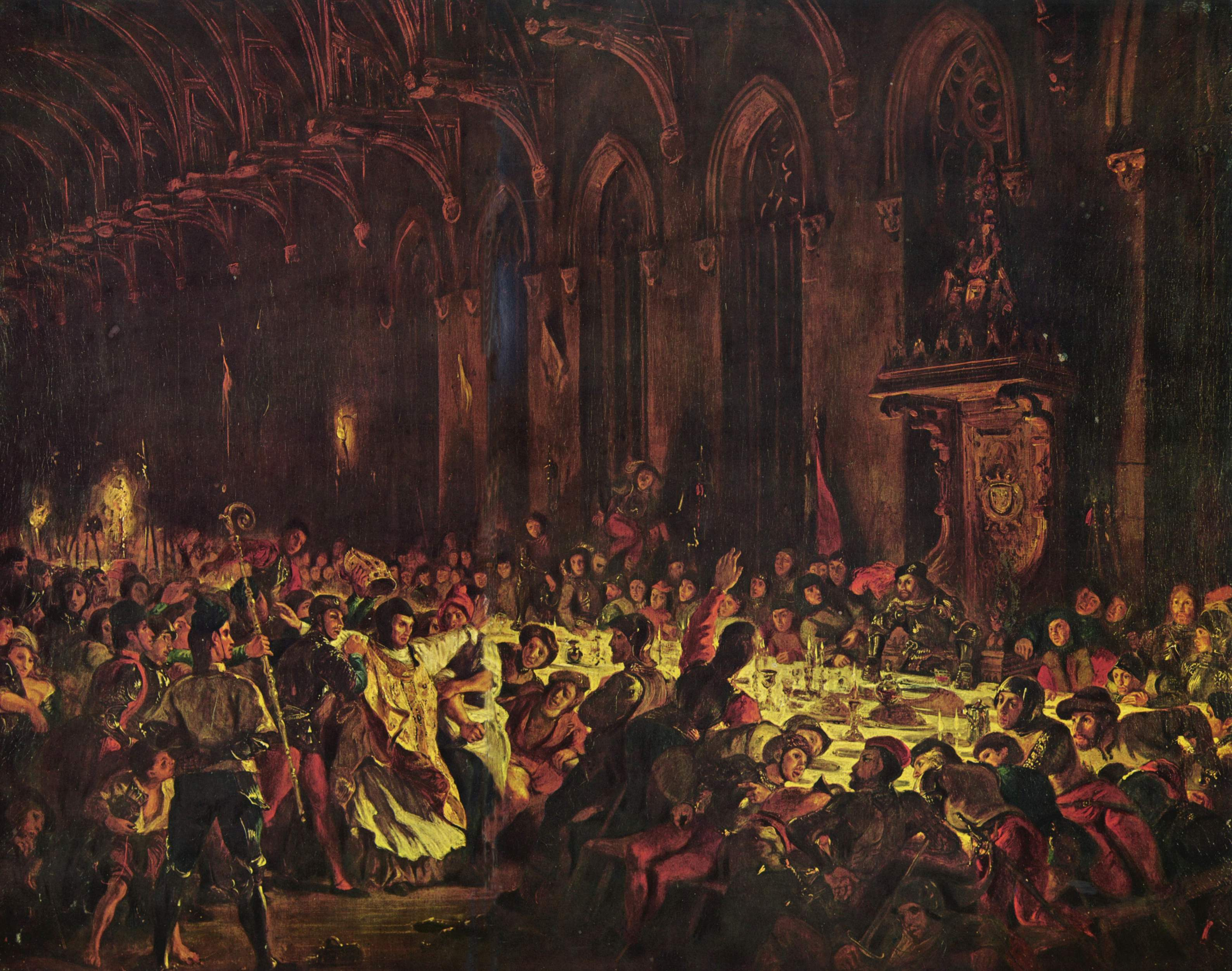
- Artist: Eugène Delacroix
- Year: 1829
- Type: Oil on canvas
- Dimensions: 91 cm × 116 cm (36 in × 46 in)
- Location: Louvre, Paris

The Murder of the Bishop of Liège is an oil painting on canvas created in 1829 by the French artist Eugène Delacroix, showing the murder of Louis de Bourbon, Bishop of Liège by William I de La Marck's men during the 15th-century Wars of Liège, as told in chapter 22 of Walter Scott's historical novel Quentin Durward. First exhibited at the Royal Academy Exhibition of 1830 in London and then at the Paris Salon of 1831, it is now in the Louvre in Paris.

Its violent subject is typical of French Romantic painting and places it alongside the same artist's The Death of Sardanapalus and The Execution of Doge Marino Faliero, also painted in the late 1820s. He produced it at the same time as Boissy d’Anglas Leading a Riot (a chiaroscuro scene of revolutionary violence in a huge room) and The Battle of Nancy (similarly inspired by late medieval warfare).

== History ==
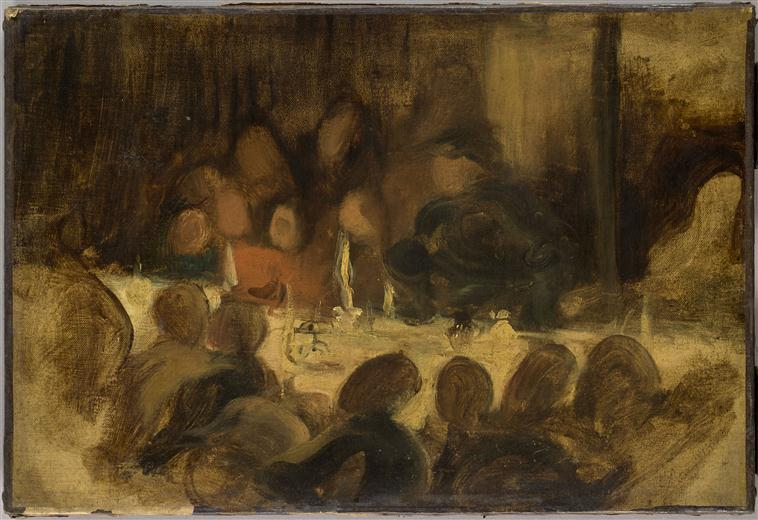
Sketch by Delacroix, c.1827

Delacroix spent May to August 1825 in Great Britain, becoming devoted to its literature, especially Scott and William Shakespeare. Murder was just one of several works by the painter to be inspired by Quentin Durward – two sketches survive of The Ardennes Boar (ink on paper, showing William I de La Marck, 15 x 10.5 cm, c. 1827–1829, private collection, Paris) and Quentin Durward and La Balafré (sketch, c.1828–1829, musée des beaux-arts de Caen).

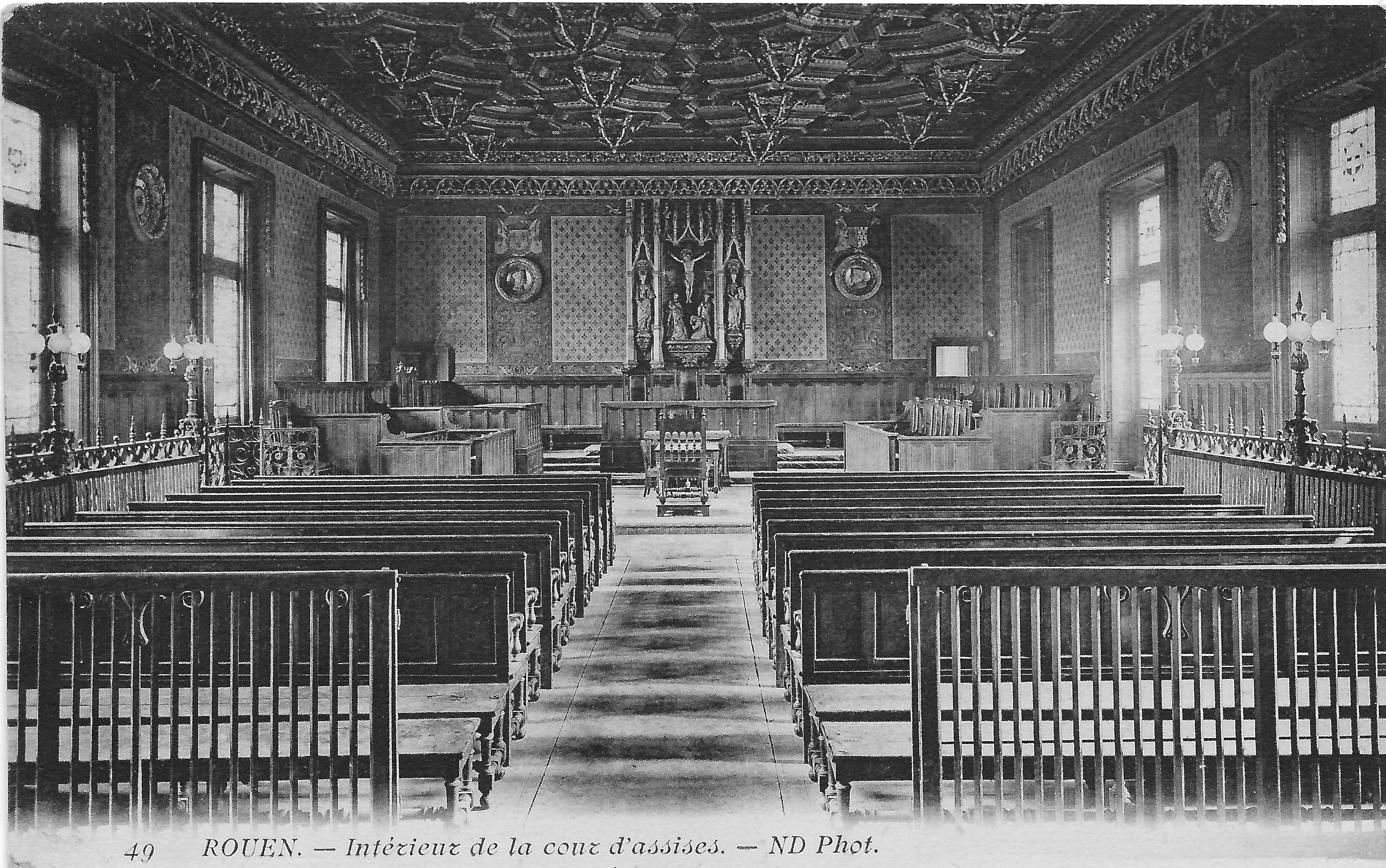
Postcard of the Great Hall of the Palais de Justice in Rouen, c.1900

Murder was commissioned by the Duke of Orléans, the future king Louis-Philippe, who became its owner. Its chiaroscuro setting was inspired by Westminster Hall in London and the Palais de Justice in Rouen. Delacroix' correspondence shows him to have been worried about the work, only completing it once he was sure it would be his "Austerlitz" not his Waterloo. For some time it was exhibited at the gallery of Henri Gaugain, an art dealer and publisher before being put on show at the 1831 Paris Salon.

For Étienne-Jean Delécluze, "this little canvas yells, shouts, blasphemes ... one hears the tipsy soldiers' obscene songs. Such figures of brigands! ... What jovial and bloodthirsty bestiality! It swarms and squeaks just as it blazes and stinks!" Théophile Gautier was enthusiastic about the work, stating that "for the movement and fury of its composition, it is an inimitable masterpiece, a painted whirlwind, everything moving frantically in this little space, emerging from which one seems to hear lamentations and thunder; never have we seen thrown onto a canvas a crowd more hard, more swarming, more screaming or more enraged [...] This painting is truly tumultuous and loud; we hear it as much as we see it." However, classical art critics savaged the work as too innovative – "[The same artist's] The Bridge at Taillebourg was a painting by a savage, and The Murder of the Bishop of Liège is furious debauchery by a barbarian. What is he in himself? A monkey adorned with Titian's meltwater."

== See also ==
- Quentin Durward at Liège, an 1828 painting by Richard Parkes Bonington based on the same novel
