= Water Meadows near Salisbury =

Painting by John Constable

- Artist: John Constable
- Year: 1820
- Type: Oil on canvas, landscape painting
- Dimensions: 45.7 cm × 55.3 cm (18.0 in × 21.8 in)
- Location: Victoria and Albert Museum, London

Water Meadows near Salisbury is an 1820 landscape painting by the British artist John Constable. It features a view of water meadows outside the city of Salisbury in Wiltshire. Constable frequently went to stay at Salisbury with his friend John Fisher, and produced a number of views of the city and its surroundings. Constable intended to display the painting at the Royal Academy Exhibition of 1830 at Somerset House, but when it was assessed by the selection committee they rejected the painting with one member describing it as a "poor thing" and "very green" unaware that it was Constable who had produced it. Although Constable had been elected a full member of the Royal Academy the previous year and was therefore entitled to have all his submitted pictures displayed, he chose to withdraw it perhaps out of a sense of embarrassment.

It was acquired by the art collector John Sheepshanks who in 1857 included it in the large Sheepshanks Gift to the nation. Today it is in the collection of the Victoria and Albert Museum in South Kensington. It featured in the 2025 exhibition Turner and Constable: Rivals and Originals at the Tate Britain.

== See also ==
- List of paintings by John Constable

== Bibliography ==
- Bietoletti, Silvestra. Neoclassicism and Romanticism. Sterling Publishing Company, 2009.
- Concannon, Amy (ed.) Turner and Constable: Rivals and Originals. Tate Publishing, 2025
- Reynolds, Graham. Constable's England. Metropolitan Museum of Art, 1983.
- Roe, Sonia. Oil Paintings in Public Ownership in the Victoria and Albert Museum. Public Catalogue Foundation, 2008.
