= Royal Stewart tartan =

Tartan associated with the House of Stewart/Stuart

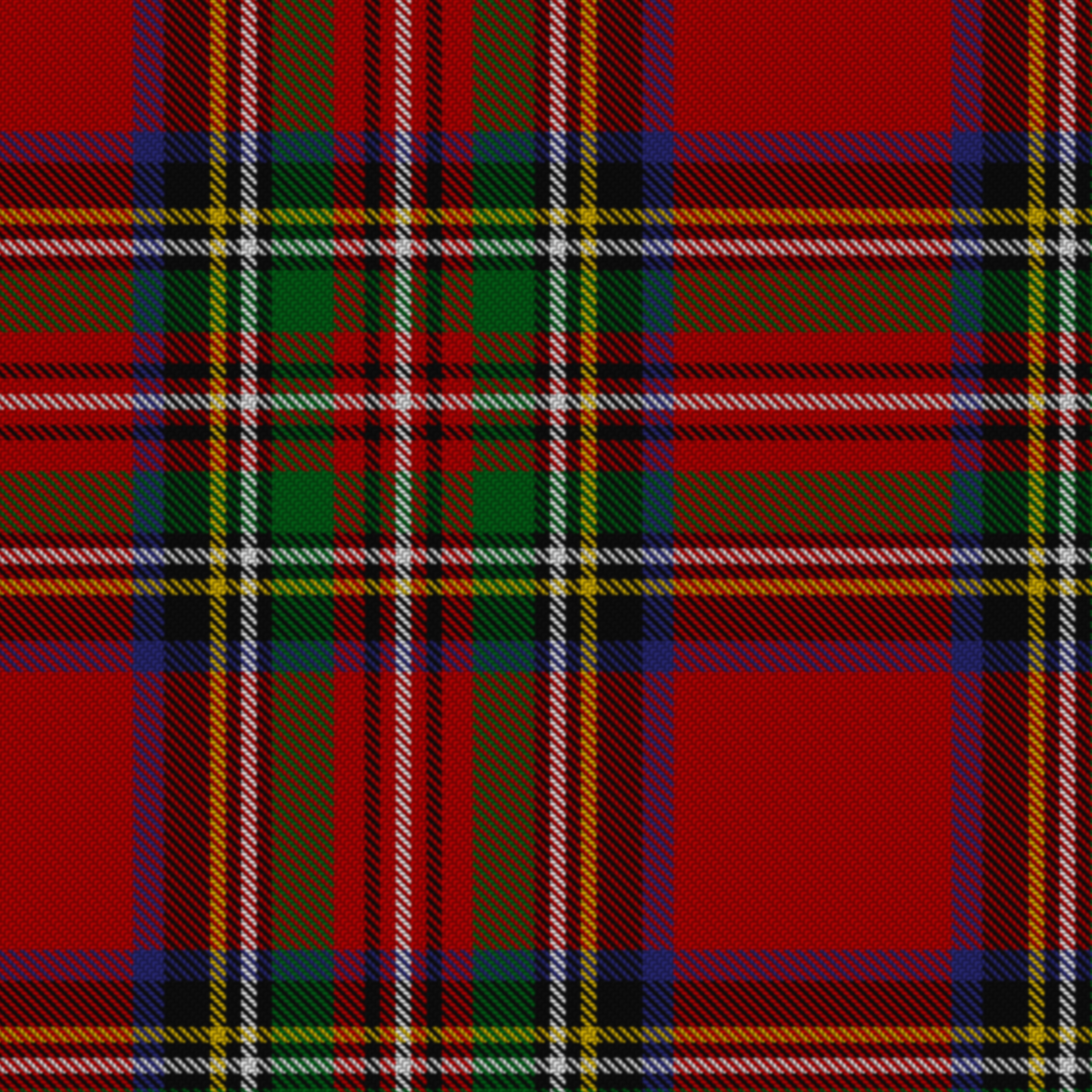
The Royal Stewart tartan

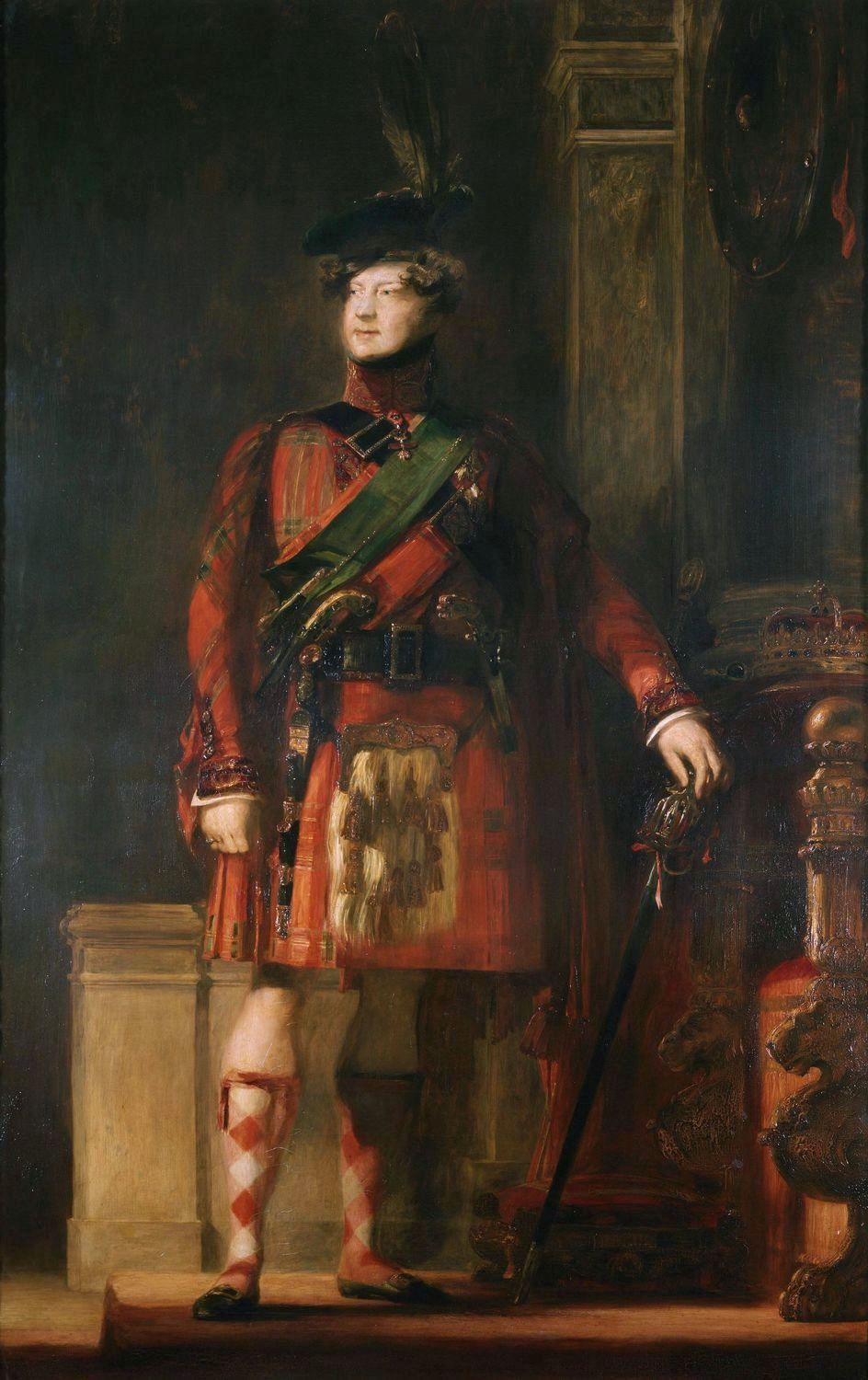
George IV in Highland Dress painted by David Wilkie to commemorate occasions during the 1822 visit of George IV to Scotland when the monarch wore a kilt, in what Sir Walter Scott described as "the royal tartan".

The Royal Stewart or Royal Stuart tartan is the best-known tartan retrospectively associated with the royal House of Stewart. It is also the personal tartan of the British monarch; the present monarch is King Charles III. The sett was first published in 1831 in the book The Scottish Gaël by James Logan. Officially, the tartan is worn by the pipers of the Black Watch, Royal Scots Dragoon Guards, and the Scots Guards, as well as a select few civilian groups like the Glasgow Police Pipe Band and the Winnipeg Police Pipe Band. The 5th Bolton Scout Group and the 5th Potters Bar Scout Group wear the scarf (neckerchief) officially, with permission from the Queen, and the Queen's Bands (of Queen's University in Kingston, Ontario, Canada) wear the tartan as part of their official uniforms. The tartan may also be worn by members who took part in a patrol leaders training course. In 1968, the pipes and drums of the 3rd battalion, Royal Australian Regiment, were also given permission to wear the Royal Stewart tartan.

== Background ==
Theoretically, this tartan should not be worn without the express permission of the British monarch. However, the Scottish Register of Tartans observes that in practice, due to its popularity, it has become a universal tartan, which can be worn by anyone who doesn't have their own clan tartan. "In the same way that clansmen wear the tartan of their chief, it is appropriate for all subjects of the [monarch] to wear the Royal Stewart tartan." Colin W. Hutcheson attributes this universalisation to "commercialisation in recent times"; traditionally, the Black Watch (darkened Old Campbell) and Hunting Stewart tartans were used as universal tartans requiring no permission.

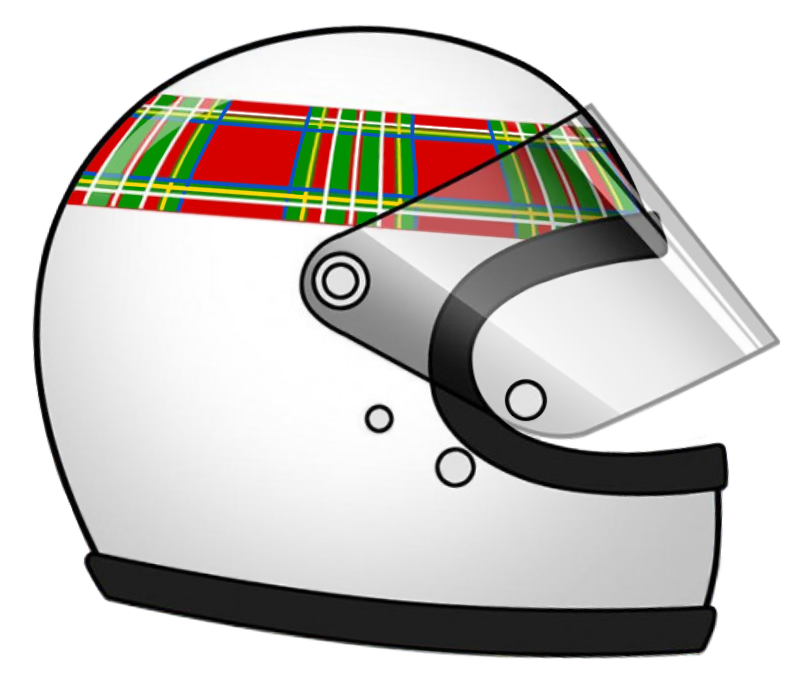
Depiction of the helmet of Jackie Stewart with the Royal Stewart tartan

In addition to its use in clothing, such as skirts and scarves, Royal Stewart tartan has also appeared on biscuit tins for Scottish shortbread such as Walker's. In the 1960s, the tartan became well known in motor racing circles, as three-time Formula One world champion Jackie Stewart from Scotland used a distinctive band of Royal Stewart tartan around his crash helmet. In the mid 1970s, Eric Faulkner of the Bay City Rollers began using the tartan for the many embellishments on his stage clothing. In the late 1970s, the Royal Stewart tartan became popular in punk fashion.
