= Quentin Durward at Liège =

Painting by Richard Parkes Bonington

- Artist: Richard Parkes Bonington
- Year: 1828
- Type: Oil on canvas, history painting
- Dimensions: 63.7 cm × 51.9 cm (25.1 in × 20.4 in)
- Location: Nottingham Castle; Nottingham

Quentin Durward at Liège is an 1828 oil painting by the British-French artist Richard Parkes Bonington. It depicts an episode from the novel Quentin Durward by Walter Scott set during the Wars of Liège in the fifteenth century. Translated into French, the novel enjoyed great popularity. Bonington shows the moment that Durward, a naïve young Scotsman is mistaken by the inhabitants of Liège as part of an advance guard of an army sent by King Louis XI to assist them in their rising against the Duke of Burgundy. He is paraded in the street between two burghers and hailed almost a saviour by the inhabitants. As in the novel Durward is portrayed as a Don Quixote-type figure.

Bonington grew up in England but moved to France where he enjoyed success with his landscapes. It has been described as the most ambitious of his history paintings. The painting was produced the year of his death from consumption. Today it is in the collection of the Nottingham City Museums and Galleries at Nottingham Castle. In 1829 Eugène Delacroix produced another work The Murder of the Bishop of Liège, based on Scott's novel.

== Bibliography ==
- Cormack, Malcolm. Bonnington. Phaidon Press, 1989.
- Fermanis, Porscha & Regan, John (ed.) Rethinking British Romantic History, 1770-1845. Oxford University Press, 2014.
- Noon, Patrick & Bann, Stephen. Constable to Delacroix: British Art and the French Romantics. Tate, 2003.
