= Portrait of Lord Aberdeen =

1830 painting by Thomas Lawrence

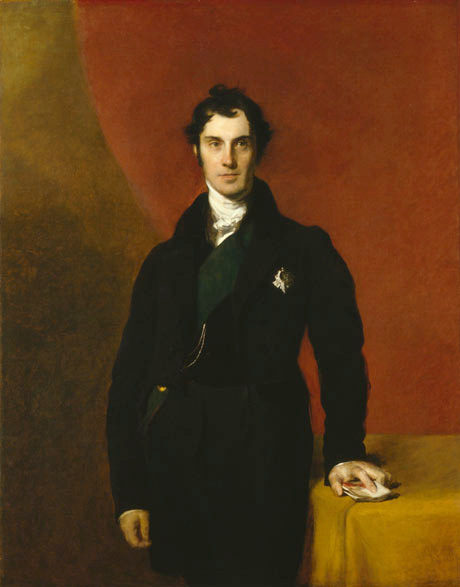
- Artist: Thomas Lawrence
- Year: 1829–30
- Type: Oil on canvas, portrait
- Dimensions: 139.8 cm × 118.8 cm (55.0 in × 46.8 in)
- Location: Private Collection

Portrait of Lord Aberdeen is an 1830 portrait painting by the English artist Thomas Lawrence depicting the Scottish aristocrat and politician George Hamilton-Gordon, Earl of Aberdeen. Aberdeen was then the British Foreign Secretary and later went on to serve as Prime Minister. As Foreign Secretary he followed in the tradition of Lord Castlereagh, one of Lawrence's frequent sitters. The work was commissioned by Aberdeen's colleague Robert Peel as part of a series of portraits of his fellow Tory politicians.

It was one of the final works by Lawrence, then Britain's leading portraitist and President of the Royal Academy. It was nearly finished at his unexpected death in January 1830. It was displayed at the Royal Academy Exhibition of 1830 at Somerset House where it was widely praised.

== Bibliography ==
- Holmes, Richard. Thomas Lawrence Portraits. National Portrait Gallery, 2010.
- Levey, Michael. Sir Thomas Lawrence. Yale University Press, 2005.
- Martin, Howard. Britain in the Nineteenth Century. Nelson Thornes, 1996.
