= Attachment (painting) =

Painting by Edwin Landseer

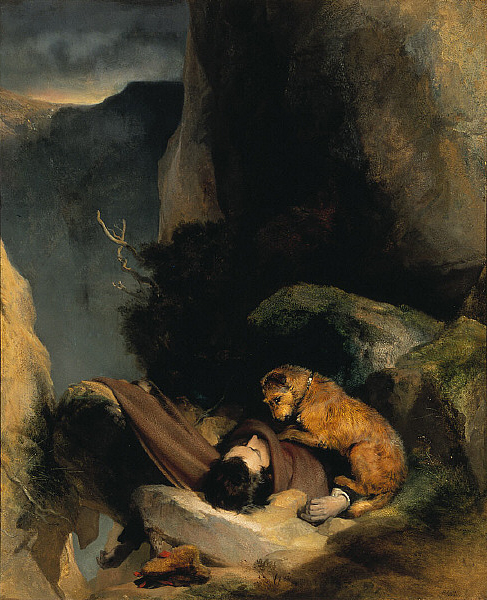
- Artist: Edwin Landseer
- Year: 1829
- Type: Oil on canvas, genre painting
- Dimensions: 101.3 cm × 83.5 cm (39.9 in × 32.9 in)
- Location: Saint Louis Art Museum, Missouri

Attachment is an 1829 oil painting by the English artist Edwin Landseer. It illustrates a scene inspired by the Scottish writer Walter Scott's 1805 poem Helvellyn. It portrays a young man who fell and died while climbing the mountain of that name in the Lake District. His faithful terrier continued to stand guard while his body still lay undiscovered. It was part of a developing theme in romantic art demonstrating a dog's love for a man in the face of death, including Landseer's 1830 diploma piece for the Royal Academy The Faithful Hound.

The work was displayed at the Royal Academy Exhibition of 1830 at Somerset House in London. In 1987, the painting was donated to the Saint Louis Art Museum in Missouri Eugene A. Perry in memory of her mother, Claude Kilpatrick.

== Bibliography ==
- Ormond, Richard. Sir Edwin Landseer. Philadelphia Museum of Art, 1981.
