= George IV in Highland Dress =

Painting by David Wilkie

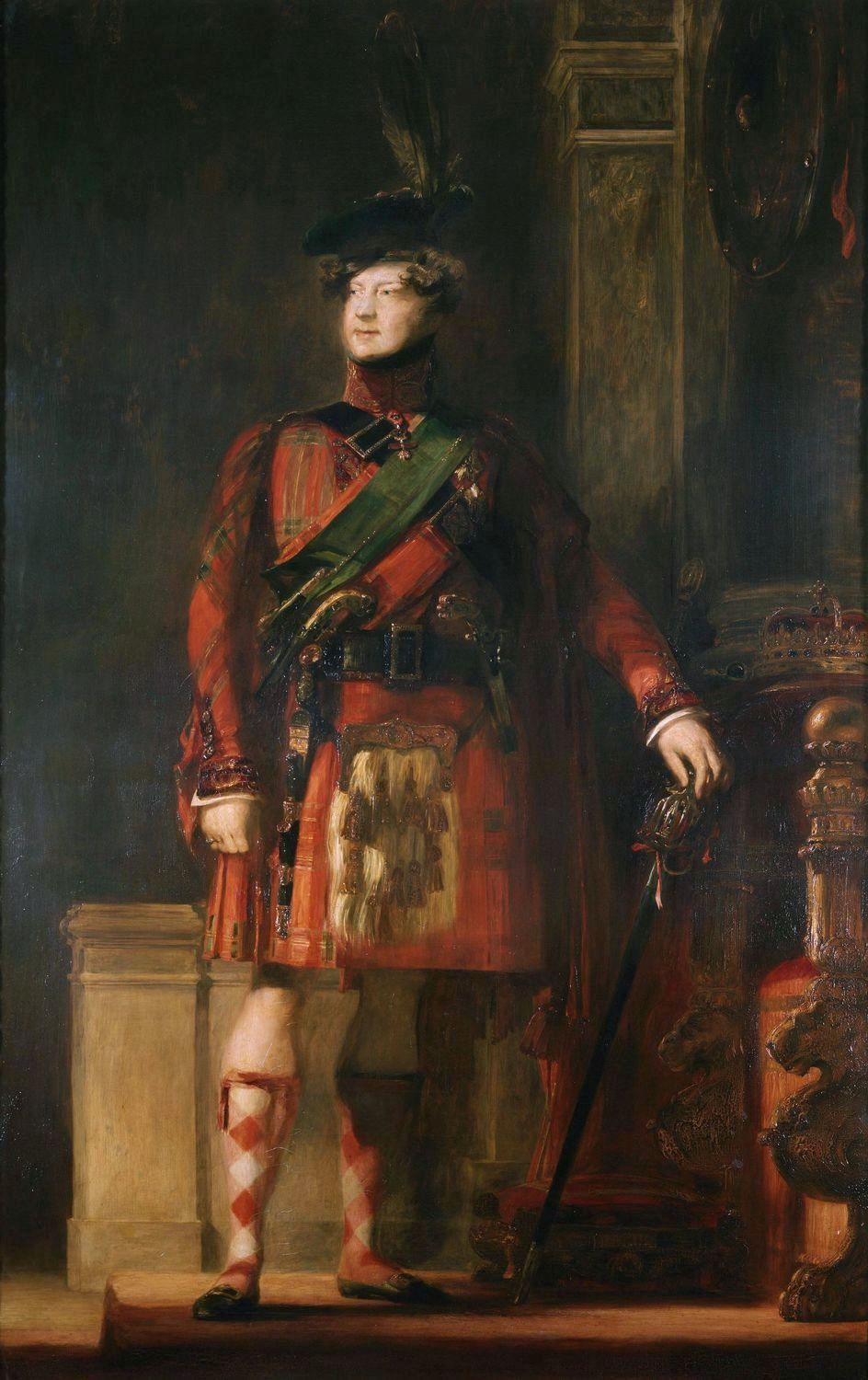
- Artist: David Wilkie
- Year: 1829
- Type: Oil on canvas, portrait painting
- Dimensions: 279.4 cm × 179.1 cm (110.0 in × 70.5 in)
- Location: Holyroodhouse, Edinburgh

George IV in Highland Dress is an 1829 portrait painting by the British artist David Wilkie. It depicts George IV in Royal Stewart tartan, wearing a kilt and the Order of the Thistle. The painting commemorates the King's 1822 Visit to Scotland.

Several noted painters were drawn to the event. J.M.W. Turner travelled to Edinburgh hoping to receive a royal commission and made several drawings and oil sketches, possibly also with an eye to the lucrative mezzotint market. However, it was Wilkie who received royal support in his plans to commemorate the trip to his native Scotland. The painting was commissioned for five hundred guineas.

As with Wilkie's history painting The Entrance of George IV to Holyroodhouse celebrating the royal visit this work took several years to finish. It was interrupted by Wilkie's lengthy visit to Continental Europe during the late 1820s. The painting was displayed at the Royal Academy Exhibition of 1830 at Somerset House a few weeks before George IV was succeeded by his brother William IV but received widespread criticism. This contrasted sharply with the positive reception of his genre scenes of the Peninsular War at the academy the previous year. Today the painting is in the Royal Collection at Holyroodhouse in Edinburgh.

== See also ==
- Portrait of William IV (Wilkie), an 1832 portrait of George's younger brother and successor

== Bibliography ==
- Coltman, Viccy. Art and Identity in Scotland: A Cultural History from the Jacobite Rising of 1745 to Walter Scott. Cambridge University Press, 2019.
- Ormond, Richard, The Face of Monarchy: British Royalty Portrayed. Phaidon, 1977.
- Tromans, Nicholas. David Wilkie: The People's Painter. Edinburgh University Press, 2007.
