= Gilbert Stuart Newton =

British painter (1795–1835)

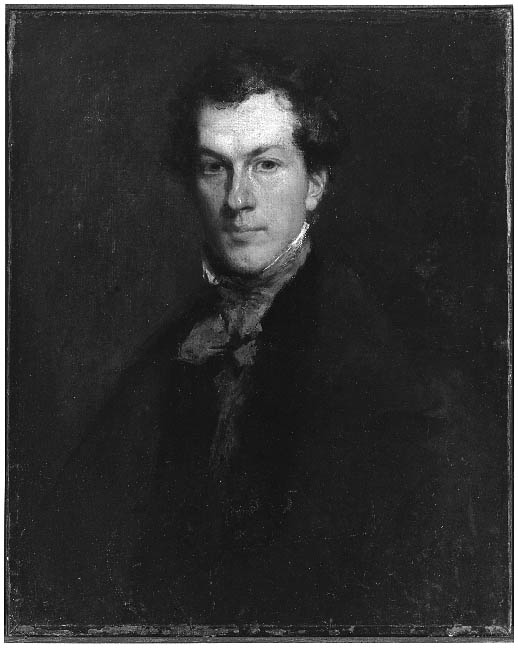
- Self-portrait, 1818
- Born: 2 September 1795; Halifax
- Died: 5 August 1835 (aged 39); Wimbledon

Gilbert Stuart Newton RA (2 September 1795 – 5 August 1835) was a British artist.

== Life ==
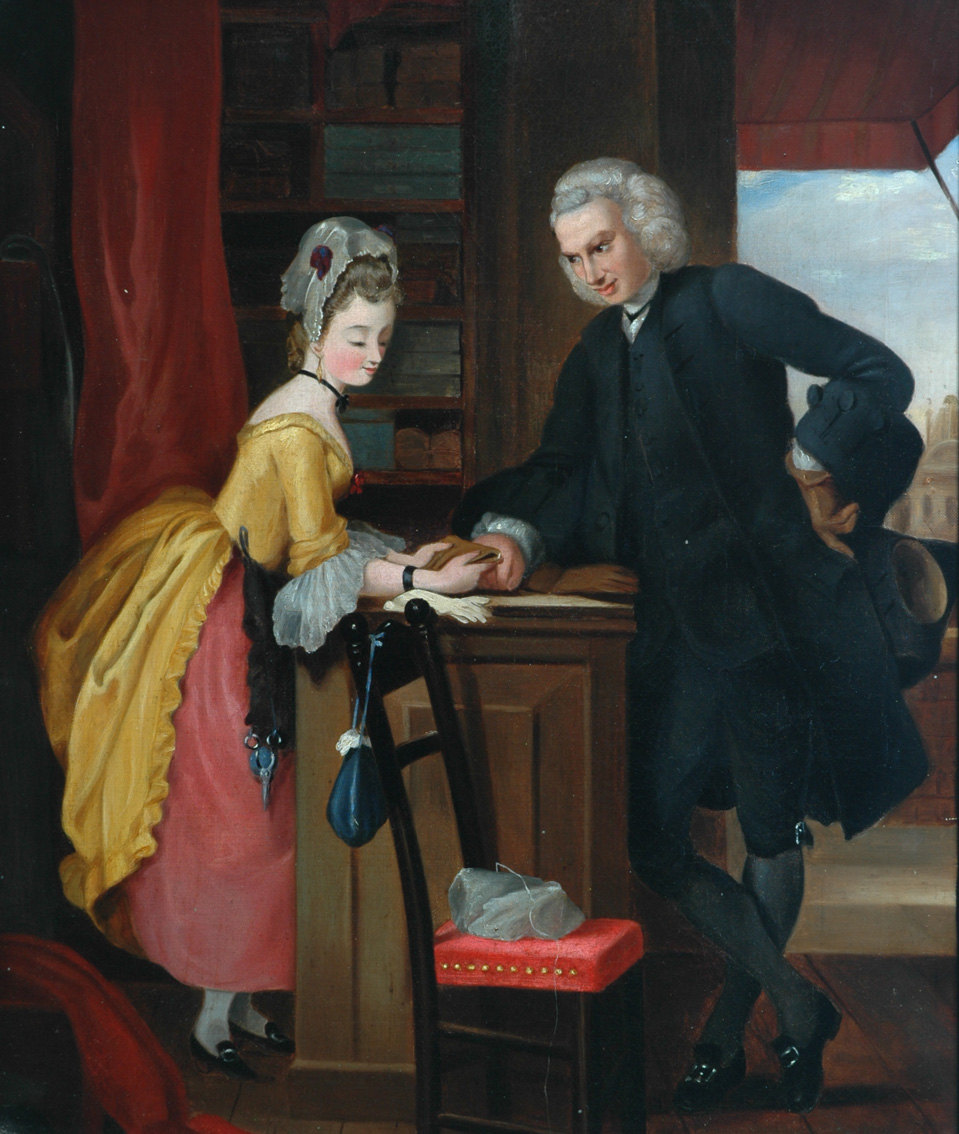
"Yorick and the Grisette", an illustration to A Sentimental Journey by Laurence Sterne

Newton was born in Halifax, Nova Scotia, the twelfth child and youngest son of Henry Newton, a customs official, and Ann, his wife, daughter of Gilbert Stuart, snuff manufacturer at Boston, Massachusetts, of Scottish descent, and sister to Gilbert Stuart the portrait painter. His parents left Boston in 1776 as the British withdrew; but on the death of his father in 1803 his mother returned with her family to Charlestown, near Boston.

Newton was intended for a commercial career, but was taken on as a pupil by his uncle, Gilbert Stuart. Newton came to Europe with an elder brother, and studied painting at Florence. In 1817 he visited Paris on his way to England and there met Charles Robert Leslie, as well as Washington Allston and David Wilkie. After visiting the Netherlands Newton went with Leslie to London, and entered as a student at the Royal Academy.

He revisited America for a short time and there married Sarah Williams Sullivan, granddaughter of James Swan (financier), Hepzibah Swan and James Sullivan (governor), returning to England with his wife. In 1827 he was elected into the National Academy of Design as an Honorary Academician. He was elected an associate of the Royal Academy in 1829 and an academician in 1832. Soon after his election to the Academy he started suffering from mental illness, and was placed in an asylum at Chelsea. He continued to paint there, where he died suffering from consumption, at Chelsea on 5 August 1835. He was buried in St Mary's Church Wimbledon. His grave is clear to see in the north end of the churchyard. His wife Sarah had returned to America with their daughter Annie Stewart Newton a few months before, and subsequently remarried.

== Works ==
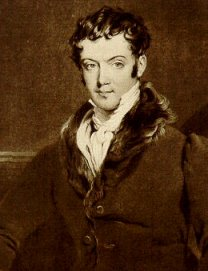
Portrait of Washington Irving

Newton first exhibited at the Royal Academy in 1818, sending portraits in that and the five following years, including one of Washington Irving, with whom he had become acquainted through Leslie. In 1823 he exhibited at the royal academy Don Quixote in his Study, the first of the subject-pictures drawn from poetry or romance with which his name was subsequently identified. It was followed by M. de Pourceaugnac, or the Patient in Spite of Himself (1824), The Dull Lecture (1825), and Captain Macheath upbraided by Polly and Lucy (1826); this last picture was purchased by the Marquis of Lansdowne, who also collected at Bowood The Vicar of Wakefield reconciling his Wife to Olivia (1828) and Polly Peachum. Two pictures, The Forsaken and The Lover's Quarrel, were engraved in The Literary Souvenir for 1826; the first with verses by Letitia Elizabeth Landon and the second with an accompanying unsigned story, later attributed to Maria Jane Jewsbury; this latter was in the Dover House collection, and, with The Adieu and another picture by Newton, was sold at Christie's on 6 May 1893. The Prince of Spain's Visit to Catalina (1827) was purchased by the Duke of Bedford and engraved in The Literary Souvenir for 1833. Seven of his paintings were published in The Atlantic Souvenir American gift book. Writing of Newton's paintings from this period, American critic John Neal of The Yankee said: "His portraits are bold and well coloured, but are not remarkable for strength of resemblance, or individuality of expression.

Two pictures by Newton, Yorick and the Grisette (1830) and The Window or the Dutch Girl (1829), were purchased by Mr. Vernon and passed with his collection to the National Gallery; a third, Portia and Bassanio (1831), forms part of the Sheepshanks collection in the South Kensington Museum. Newton painted numerous other pictures, which found immediate purchasers, and were nearly all engraved. Among them were: Lear, Cordelia, and the Physician (Lord Ashburton), Abbot Boniface (Earl of Essex), The Duenna (royal collection), and The Importunate Author. He painted several portraits, including those of Thomas Moore, Sir Walter Scott, and Lady Theresa Lister. In 1842 a collection of engravings from his pictures was published with notices by Henry Murray, F.S.A., entitled The Gems of Stuart Newton, R.A. A portrait of his mother, Anne Stuart Newton, resides at the Berkshire Museum in Pittsfield, Massachusetts. A posthumous portrait of Mary Holyland Carmichael Smythe, wife of James Carmichael-Smyth, is attributed to Newton, and is in the private home of one of her great-great-great-grandsons. Said portrait was restored on the BBC programme The Repair Shop by conservator Lucia Scalisi, who noted that it seems to be based on the original by painter George Romney that hangs in the Scottish National Portrait Gallery.

== Literary connections ==
Newton's picture of A Girl at her Devotions is twice poetically examined by Letitia Elizabeth Landon, firstly in her Poetical Catalogue of Pictures in The Literary Gazette, 1823, as Different Thoughts; Suggested by a Picture by G. S. Newton, No. 16, in the British Gallery, and representing a Girl looking at her Lover's Miniature.., and again in her Poetical Sketches of Modern Pictures in The Troubadour (1826), as A Girl at her Devotions.. A similar rendition of his painting The Disconsolate appeared in the Literary Gazette, 1829, with her poem Lines on Newton’s Picture of the Disconsolate.

In addition to the pictures illustrated by Letitia Elizabeth Landon in The Literary Souvenir mentioned above, she wrote a further poetic illustration to The Gentle Student. (with an engraving by Charles Rolls) in The Amulet, 1833.

In conjunction with the painting above of The Prince of Spain's Visit to Catalina is a poem by Felicia Hemans, On a Picture Representing an Italian Contadina and her Family.
