= Pilate Washing his Hands =

Painting by J. M. W. Turner

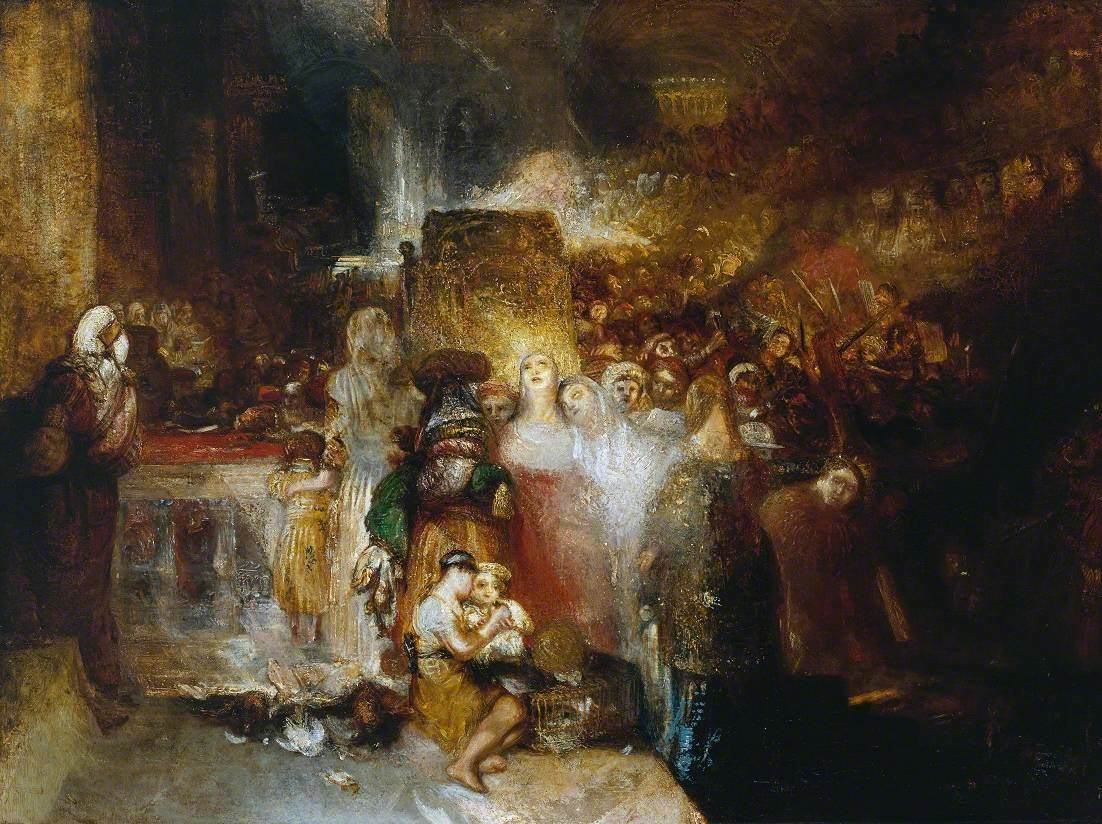
- Artist: J. M. W. Turner
- Year: 1830
- Type: Oil on canvas, history painting
- Dimensions: 91.4 cm × 121.9 cm (36.0 in × 48.0 in)
- Location: Tate Britain, London
- Accession: N00510
- Website: tate.org.uk/art/artworks/turner-pilate-washing-his-hands-n00510

Pilate Washing his Hands is an 1830 history painting by the British artist J.M.W. Turner. It depicts the biblical scene of the Roman official Pontius Pilate symbolically washing his hands during the trial of Jesus Christ.

Turner produced the work as a direct homage to paintings of the Dutch seventeenth century Old Masters Rembrandt. It was shown at the Royal Academy's 1830 Summer Exhibition at Somerset House to a hostile critical reception, with the Literary Gazette calling it "wretched and abortive". Part of the Turner Bequest of 1856 to the National Gallery it is today in the collection of the Tate Britain.

== See also ==
- List of paintings by J. M. W. Turner

== Bibliography ==
- Bailey, Anthony. J.M.W. Turner: Standing in the Sun. Tate Enterprises, 2013.
- Hamilton, James. Turner - A Life. Sceptre, 1998.
- Pointon, Marcia C. Brilliant Effects: A Cultural History of Gem Stones and Jewellery
- Reynolds, Graham. Turner. Thames and Hudson, 2022.
