= 1830 in art =

Events from the year 1830 in art.

== Events ==
- 7 January – The President of the Royal Academy Thomas Lawrence dies in London. His friend Turner paints the watercolour Funeral of Sir Thomas Lawrence depicting his burial at St Paul's Cathedral
- 3 May – Royal Academy Exhibition of 1830 opens at Somerset House
- David Wilkie appointed Principal Painter in Ordinary to King William IV of the United Kingdom following the death of Sir Thomas Lawrence.
- Clarkson Stanfield's panorama The Military Pass of the Simplon is featured in a Christmas pantomime in London.
- The Glyptothek museum of classical sculpture, commissioned by King Ludwig I of Bavaria, is opened as Munich's first public museum.
- Approximate beginning of the Barbizon school of painters.

== Works ==
Eugène Delacroix, Liberty Leading the People, (1830), Louvre, Paris

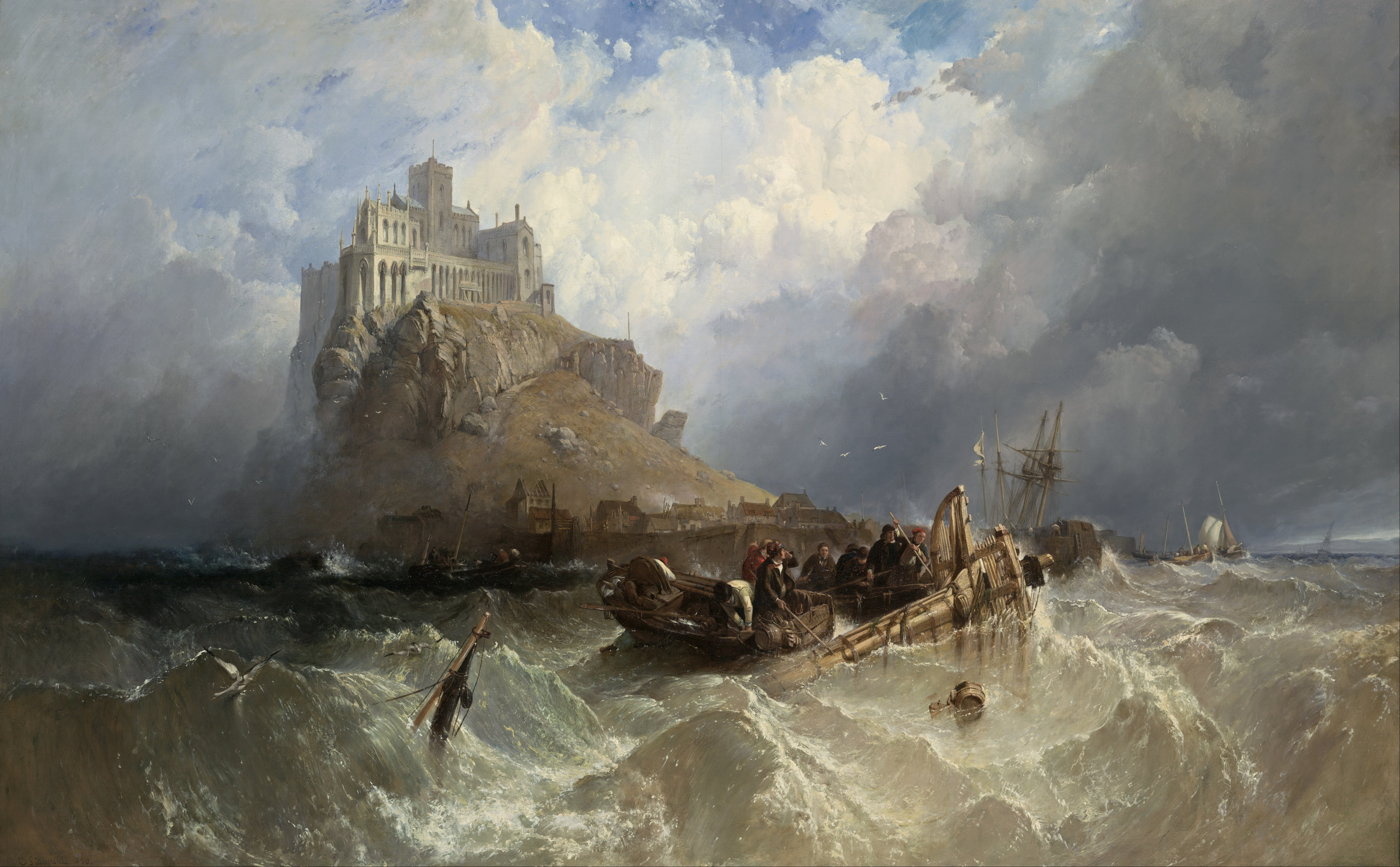
Mount St Michael, Cornwall by Clarkson Stanfield, 1830

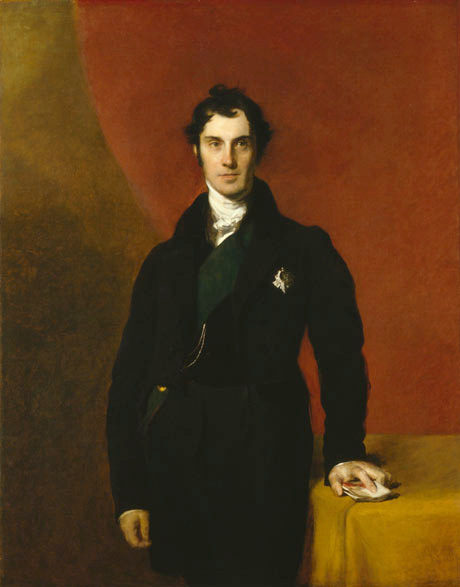
Portrait of Lord Aberdeen by Thomas Lawrence

- Henry Perronet Briggs – Fanny Kemble and Sarah Siddons
- Margaret Sarah Carpenter – Portrait of Richard Parkes Bonington
- George Catlin – General William Clark
- Léon Cogniet – Scenes of July 1830
- John Constable
  - The Glebe Farm
  - Helmingham Dell
- Jean-Baptiste-Camille Corot
  - The Cathedral of Chartres
  - The Forest of Fontainebleau (c.)
- Eugène Delacroix
  - The Battle of Poitiers
  - Liberty Leading the People
- Henri Decaisne – Maria Malibran as Desdemona
- Charles Lock Eastlake – Hagar and Ishmael
- William Etty — Candaules, King of Lydia, Shews his Wife by Stealth to Gyges, One of his Ministers, as She Goes to Bed
- Sarah Goodridge – Self-portrait
- Francesco Hayez – Carlotta Chabert as Venus
- Franz Krüger – Parade in the Opernplatz in Berlin
- Edwin Landseer
  - The Faithful Hound
  - The Stone Breaker and His Daughter
- Thomas Lawrence – Portrait of Lord Aberdeen
- Carl Friedrich Lessing - A King and Queen in Mourning
- Georges Michel – L'Orage (approximate date)
- Luigi Mussini – Death of Atala
- Samuel Palmer – Coming from Evening Church
- Hendrik Scheffer – The Arrest of Charlotte Corday
- Clarkson Stanfield – Mount St Michael, Cornwall
- William Strickland – Nathanael Greene Monument
- J. M. W. Turner
  - Calais Sands at Low Water
  - Funeral of Sir Thomas Lawrence
  - The Evening Star
  - Jessica
  - Pilate Washing his Hands
- Horace Vernet – Portrait of Louise Vernet
- David Wilkie
  - The Entrance of George IV at Holyroodhouse
  - The Guerilla's Return

== Publications ==
- Edward Lear – Illustrations of the Family of Psittacidae, or Parrots (first in a series of lithographs.

== Awards ==
- Grand Prix de Rome, painting:
- Grand Prix de Rome, sculpture:
- Grand Prix de Rome, architecture:
- Grand Prix de Rome, music: Hector Berlioz & Alexandre Montfort ("second" First Grand Prize).

== Births ==
- January 7 – Albert Bierstadt, landscape painter (died 1902)
- January 17 - Blaise Alexandre Desgoffe, French still-life painter (died 1901)
- April 9 – Eadweard Muybridge – photographer (died 1904)
- June 29 – John Quincy Adams Ward, sculptor (died 1910)
- July 9 – Henry Peach Robinson, photographer (died 1901)
- July 10 – Camille Pissarro, impressionist painter (died 1903)
- August 6 – Francis Bicknell Carpenter, American painter (died 1900)
- August 12 – John O'Connor, painter (died 1889)
- August 29 – John William Inchbold, pre-Raphaelite painter (died 1888)
- October 24 – Marianne North, English naturalist and flower painter (died 1890)
- December 3 – Frederic Leighton, 1st Baron Leighton, painter and sculptor (died 1896)
- date unknown – Nikolai Nevrev, Russian painter (died 1904)

== Deaths ==
- January 7 – Sir Thomas Lawrence – English portrait painter (born 1769)
- February 11 – Johann Baptist von Lampi the Elder, Austrian historical and portrait painter (born 1751)
- February 14 – Jean-Baptiste Giraud, French sculptor (born 1752)
- February 16 – Edme Quenedey des Ricets, French miniature painter and engraver (born 1756)
- February 23 – Jan Piotr Norblin, French-born Polish painter and engraver (born 1740)
- February 28 – Gaspare Landi, Italian Neoclassical painter (born 1756)
- April 10 – Johann Jakob Biedermann, Swiss painter and etcher (born 1763)
- May 11 – János Donát, Hungarian painter (born 1744)
- August – William Payne, English painter, inventor of Payne's grey (born 1760)
- August 22 – Jakob Wilhelm Roux, German draughtsman and painter (born 1771)
- September 15 – François Baillairgé, Canadian artist of woodworking, wood-carving, and architecture (born 1759)
- September 21 – Louis-Marie Autissier, French-born Belgian portrait miniature painter (born 1772)
- November 8 – Sylvester Shchedrin, Russian landscape painter (born 1791)
- November 17 – Petrus Johannes van Regemorter, Flemish landscape and genre painter (born 1755)
- December 7 – Joseph Stannard, English painter of the Norwich school (born 1797)
- December 15 – Moritz Kellerhoven, Austrian painter (born 1758)
- date unknown
  - Pavel Đurković, Serbian painter and muralist (born 1772).
  - Rosalie Duthé, French courtesan and artists' model (born 1748).
  - Agustín Esteve, Spanish portraitist and royal court painter (born 1753)
