= Parade in the Opernplatz in Berlin =

Painting by Franz Krüger

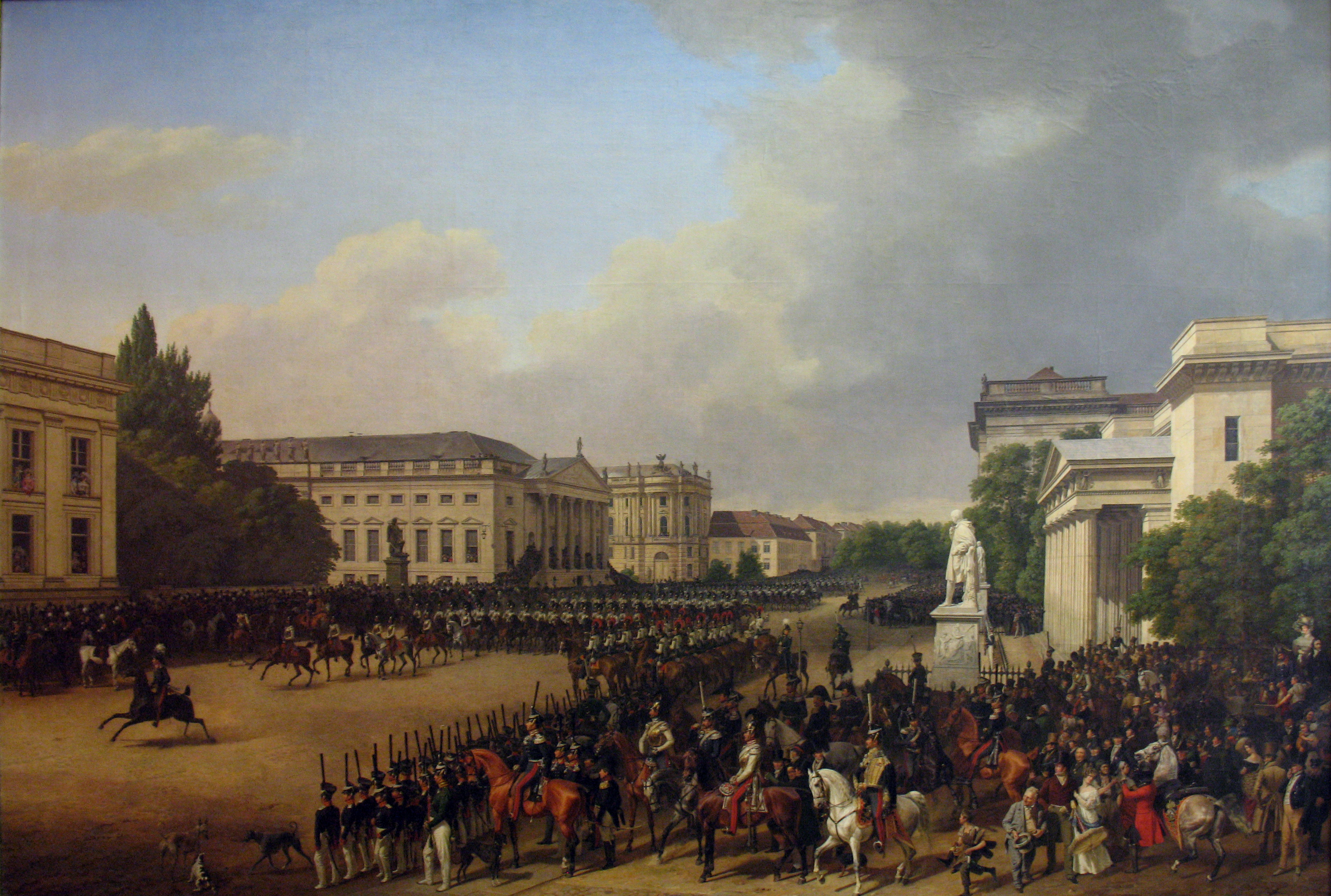
- Artist: Franz Krüger
- Year: 1824–30
- Type: Oil on canvas, history painting
- Dimensions: 249 cm × 374 cm (98 in × 147 in)
- Location: Alte Nationalgalerie, Berlin

Parade in the Opernplatz in Berlin (German: Parade auf dem Opernplatz in Berlin) is an 1830 history painting by the German artist Franz Krüger. It shows a parade on the Unter den Linden in Berlin in 1817. It portrays the Sixth Brandenburg Cuirassiers parading for Grand Duke Nicholas of Russia. Nicholas, later Tsar of Russia, was in the Prussian capital to marry Princess Charlotte. Her father Frederick William III can be seen by the Neue Wache.

For many years it hung at the Winter Palace in Saint Petersburg, before being gifted to Germany before the First World War. Today it is part of the collection of the Alte Nationalgalerie on the Museum Island in Berlin. A later companion piece Parade in Potsdam in 1817 was commissioned by Nicholas.

== Bibliography ==
- Börsch-Supan, Helmut & Kessler-Aurisch, Helga. Romantics, Realists, Revolutionaries: Masterpieces of 19th-century German Painting from the Museum of Fine Arts, Leipzig. Prestel, 2000.
- Keisch, Claude. Die Alte Nationalgalerie Berlin. C.H.Beck, 2005.
