= Parade in Potsdam in 1817 =

1849 painting by Franz Krüger

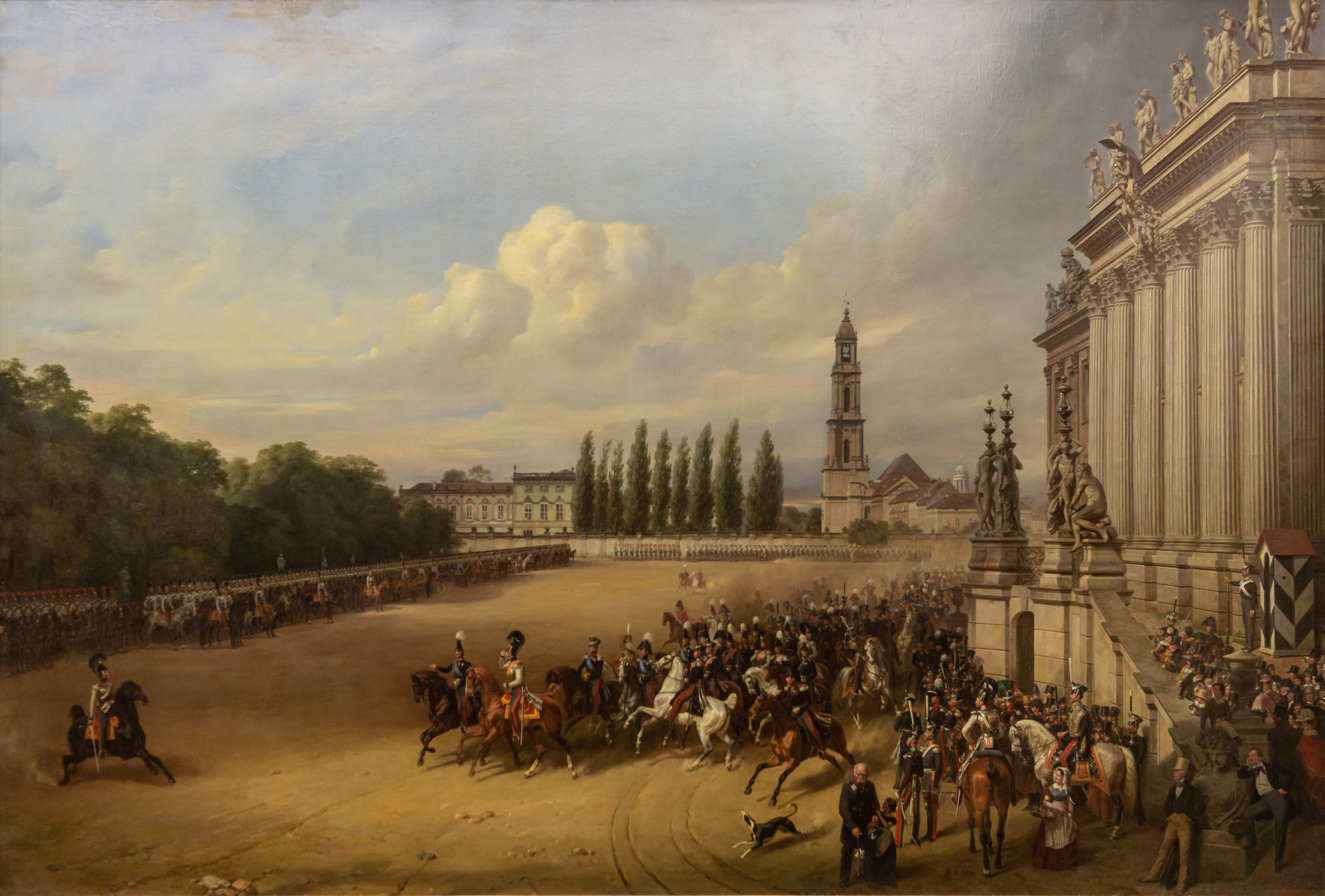
- Artist: Franz Krüger
- Year: 1848–49
- Type: Oil on canvas, history painting
- Dimensions: 249 cm × 374 cm (98 in × 147 in)
- Location: Alte Nationalgalerie, Berlin

Parade in Potsdam in 1817 (German: Parade in Potsdam im Jahre 1817) is an 1849 history painting by the German artist Franz Krüger. It was commissioned by Nicholas I of Russia as a companion work to the artist's earlier Parade in the Opernplatz in Berlin. It depicts a scene that took place on 20 April 1817 Potsdam in the Kingdom of Prussia.

Nicholas commissioned the work while Krüger was in Saint Petersburg. He completed the painting in Dessau where he was staying due to unrest in Berlin following the Revolution of 1848. It commemorates the 1817 visit of the then Grand Duke Nicolas to Prussia for his marriage to Prince Charlotte, the eldest daughter of Frederick William III. The setting is the Lustergartenplatz in front of City Palace with the tower of the Garrison Church visible. Nicholas is assuming honorary command of the Sixth Brandenburg Cuirassiers. Amongst other figures visible are the future monarchs Frederick William IV and William I, as well as Prince Charles, Prince Augustus, Karl Friedrich Schinkel and Karl Friedrich Schinkel. Today it is in the collection of the Alte Nationalgalerie on the Museum Island in Berlin.

== Bibliography ==
- Pelizzari, Luciano, Menzel, Adolph & Auernheimer, Richard. Menzel in Verona: die Italienreisen des grossen deutschen Malers des 19. Jahrhunderts. E. A. Seemann, 2008.
- Schweers, Hans F. Gemälde in deutschen Museen: Katalog der ausgestellten und depotgelagerten Werke. K.G. Saur, 2002.
