= L'Orage =

Painting by Georges Michel

- The Thunderstorm
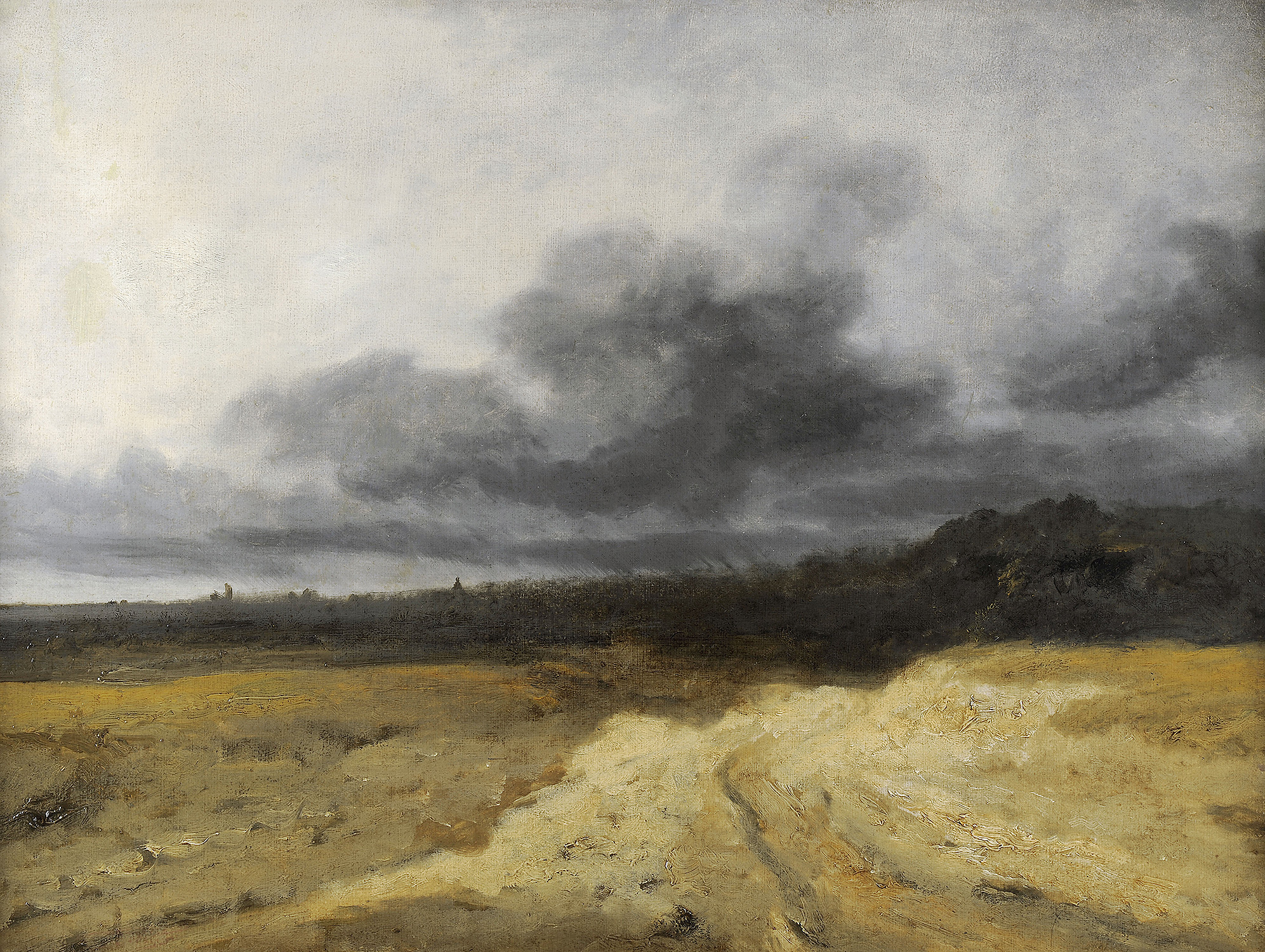
- Artist: Georges Michel
- Year: c. 1830
- Medium: oil paintings on canvas
- Movement: Romanticism
- Subject: Landscape painting Thunderstorm
- Dimensions: 48 cm × 63 cm (19 in × 25 in)
- Location: Musée des Beaux-Arts, Strasbourg

L'Orage (The Thunderstorm) is a circa 1830 Romantic landscape painting by the French painter Georges Michel, depicting a thunderstorm gathering over Montmartre (then a village on the outskirts of Paris). It is now in the Musée des Beaux-Arts of Strasbourg, France. Its inventory number is 937.

L'Orage is considered as George Michel's masterpiece for its daring composition and its bold brushwork. It has been described as beyond anticipating Impressionism and Barbizon Realism, and as announcing the landscape paintings of Expressionists such as Constant Permeke, and Emil Nolde.
