= 6th (Brandenburg) Cuirassiers "Emperor Nicholas I of Russia" =

Heavy cavalry regiment of the Royal Prussian Army

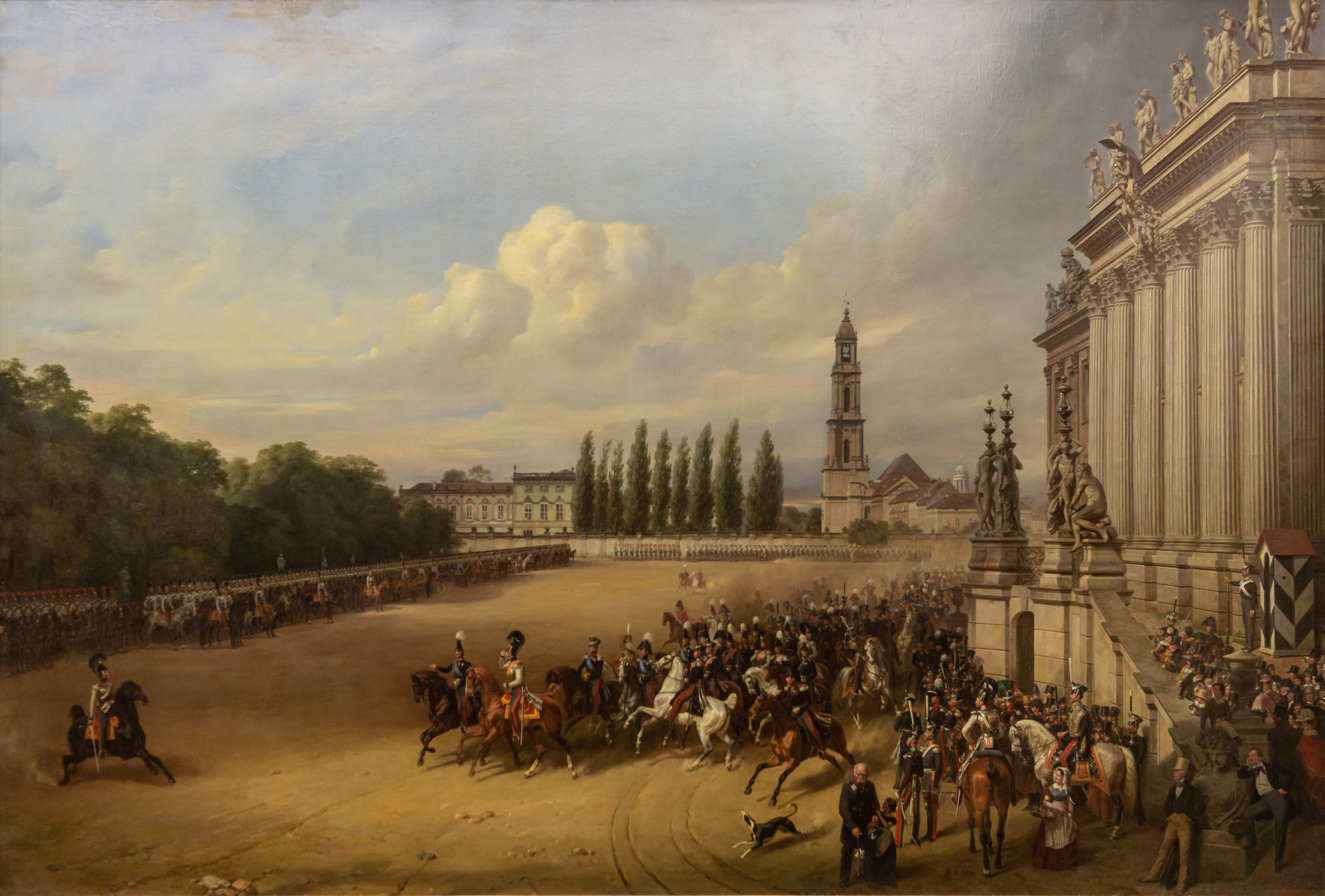
Parade in Potsdam in 1817 by Franz Krüger features the regiment.

The 6th (Brandenburg) Cuirassiers “Emperor Nicholas I of Russia” were a heavy cavalry regiment of the Royal Prussian Army. The regiment was formed in 1807. The regiment fought in the War of the Sixth Coalition, the Second Schleswig War, the Austro-Prussian War, the Franco-Prussian War and World War I. The regiment was disbanded in 1919.

== See also ==
- List of Imperial German cavalry regiments
