= The Evening Star (painting) =

Painting by J. M. W. Turner

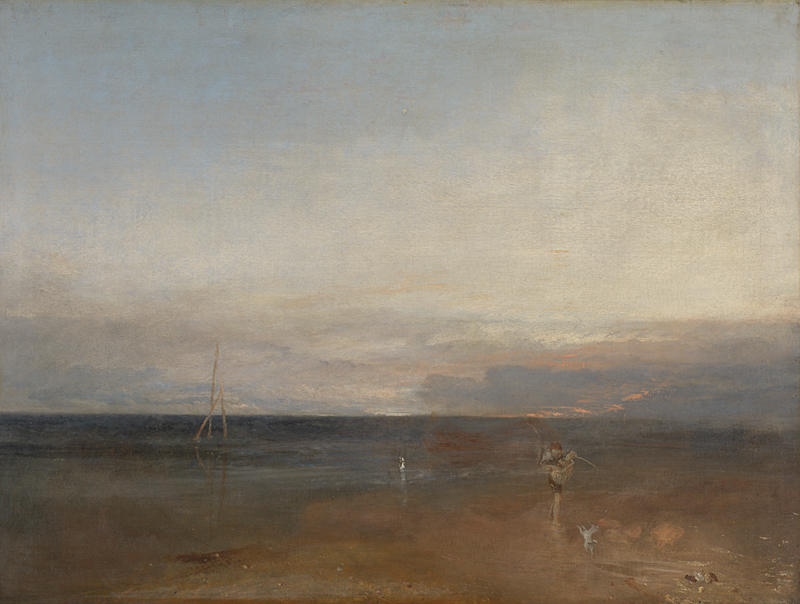
- Artist: J. M. W. Turner
- Year: c.1830
- Medium: Oil on canvas
- Dimensions: 91.1 cm × 122.6 cm (35.9 in × 48.3 in)
- Location: National Gallery, London
- Accession: NG1991
- Website: nationalgallery.org.uk/...star

The Evening Star is an 1830 landscape painting by the British artist J.M.W. Turner. It features a coastal scene on a beach with a boy with a shrimping net wading out of the water to be greeted by his dog. It gained its title several decades after Turner painted it due to the presence of a single star visible in the sky.

The painting was exhibited with other works by Turner at the Tate Gallery in 1906, where critics compared it to more recent works by James McNeill Whistler. It is in the possession of the National Gallery in London, having been part of the Turner Bequest of 1856.

== See also ==
- List of paintings by J. M. W. Turner

== Bibliography ==
- Hardy, William. Turner. Chartwell books, 2003.
- Smiles, Sam. J. M. W. Turner: The Making of a Modern Artist. Manchester University Press, 2007.
