= The Guerilla's Return =

Painting by David Wilkie

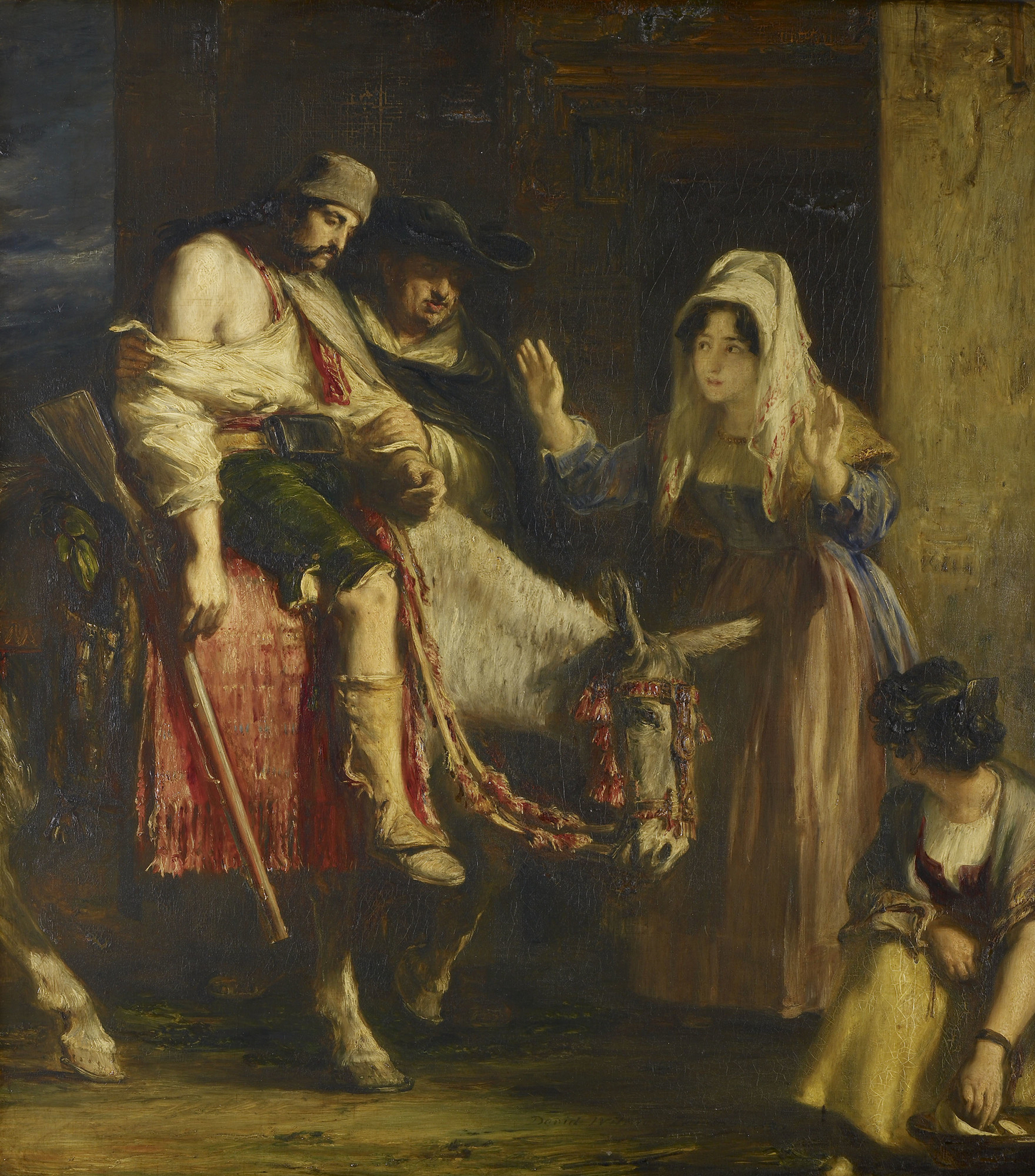
- Artist: David Wilkie
- Year: 1830
- Type: Oil on canvas, genre painting
- Dimensions: 95 cm × 84.5 cm (37 in × 33.3 in)
- Location: Royal Collection

The Guerilla's Return is an 1830 history painting by the British artist David Wilkie. It is part of the Royal Collection of the United Kingdom.

== History and description ==
Wilkie had visited Spain a few years earlier and produced three works set during the Peninsular War (1808–1814). After they were exhibited at the Royal Academy's Summer Exhibition in 1828 they were purchased by George IV. Around this time Wilkie shifted his style which previously echoed the genre paintings of David Teniers the Younger but now used the oil sketches of Rubens as an inspiration.

The king then commissioned Wilkie to produce a sequel to one of them, The Guerilla's Departure. The new painting showed the return, on a mule, of one of the Spanish guerrillas who fought against Napoleon's invading French forces. Wounded and tired, he is assisted by the confessor who had sent him on his mission in the earlier painting and two women, including his wife. Visually the composition echoes Christ's entry into Jerusalem. Wilkie was paid four hundred guineas by George IV for the work. It remains in the Royal Collection and was recorded hanging in Buckingham Palace in 1858 during the reign of Queen Victoria.

== Bibliography ==
- Baker, Christopher, Howarth, David & Stirton, Paul. The Discovery of Spain: British Artists and Collectors: Goya to Picasso. National Galleries of Scotland, 2009.
- Clarke, Deborah & Remington, Vanessa. Scottish Artists 1750-1900: From Caledonia to the Continent. Royal Collection Trust, 2015.
- Tromans, Nicholas. David Wilkie: The People's Painter. Edinburgh University Press, 2007.
