= The Cathedral of Chartres =

Painting by Jean-Baptiste-Camille Corot

- La Cathédral de Chartres (French)
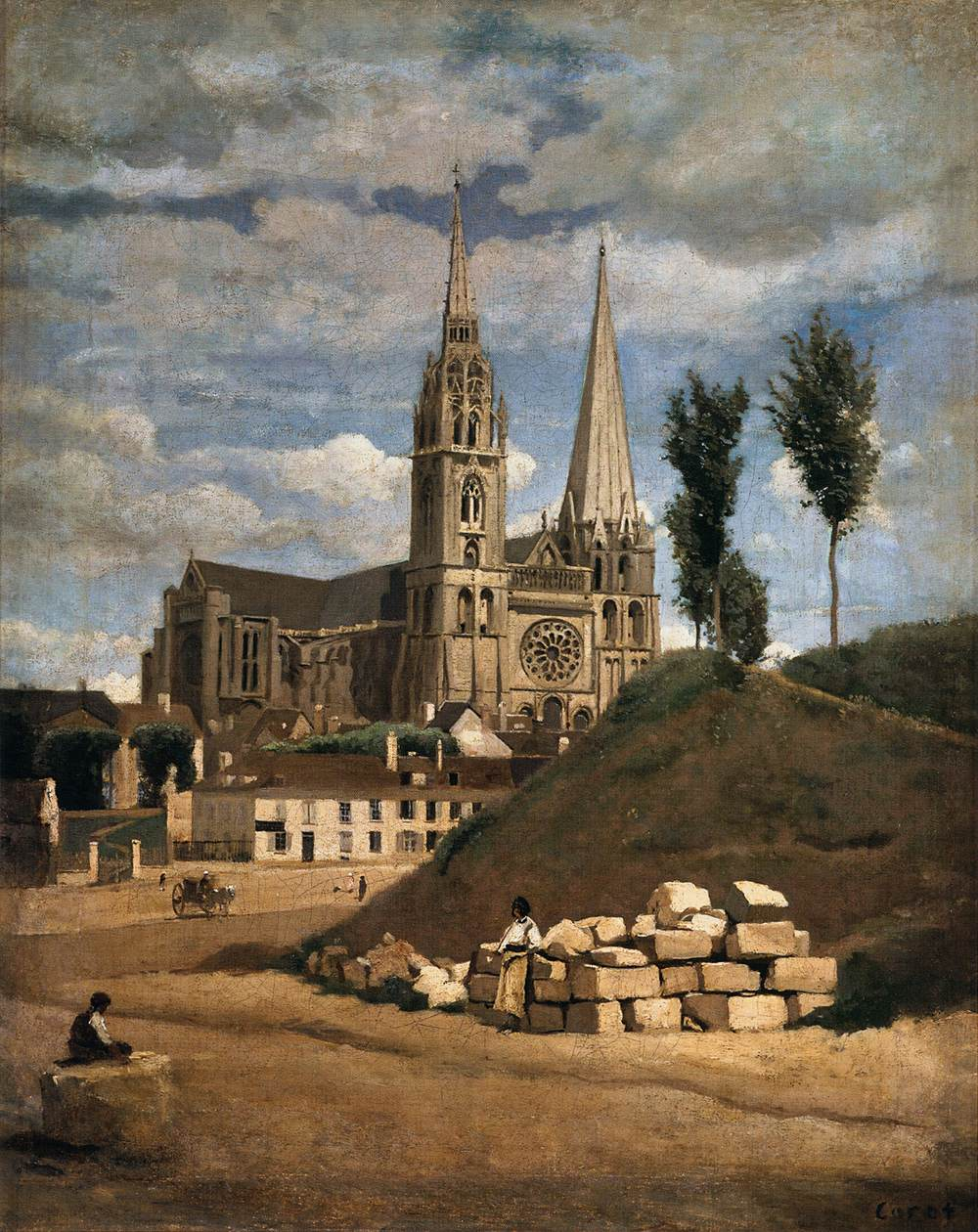
- Artist: Jean-Baptiste-Camille Corot
- Year: 1830
- Medium: Oil on canvas
- Dimensions: 64 cm × 51.5 cm (25 in × 20.3 in)
- Location: Louvre, Paris

The Cathedral of Chartres is an oil painting on canvas of Chartres Cathedral by the French artist Jean-Baptiste-Camille Corot, created in 1830. After being sold several times, it has been held in the Musée du Louvre, in Paris since 1906.

== Description and analysis ==
Corot began the painting on the motif in 1830, during the July Revolution which led him to flee Paris. He returned to it 42 years later, in 1872, when he enlarged the format with a relining and placed a character in the foreground.

The painting shows the west front of Chartres Cathedral bathed in a warm afternoon light that accentuates its luminosity. The cathedral, with clear and precise lines, has two juxtaposed spires, whose verticality is taken up by the two slender trees on the right, according to a balanced and coherent composition found also in other works by Corot.

In the scene depicted, there is a serene harmony between Nature and man-made elements: in front of the compact mass of the church, there are two grassy hills, at the foot of which is a pile of building materials. Nature also welcomes man: the characters that populate the scene are distinct, from the boy squatting on the square stone on the left to the carter in the background.

The composition is divided into four planes, described respectively by the dusty road, the heap of building stones piled on the hill, the curtain of houses spread out along the road and the facade of the Gothic cathedral, which dominates the scene, rising into the sky. The scene is devoid of picturesque suggestions: everything appears random, and not even the Cathedral of Chartres has a prominent role over the other elements of the painting, with which it blends harmoniously.

== Cultural references ==
French novelist Marcel Proust mentions the painting in the first volume of his novel In Search of Lost Time. Proust considered Corot's painting "as one of the eight paintings worthy of appearing in a French gallery of paintings at the Louvre in 1920".
