= Maria Malibran as Desdemona =

Painting by Henri Decaisne

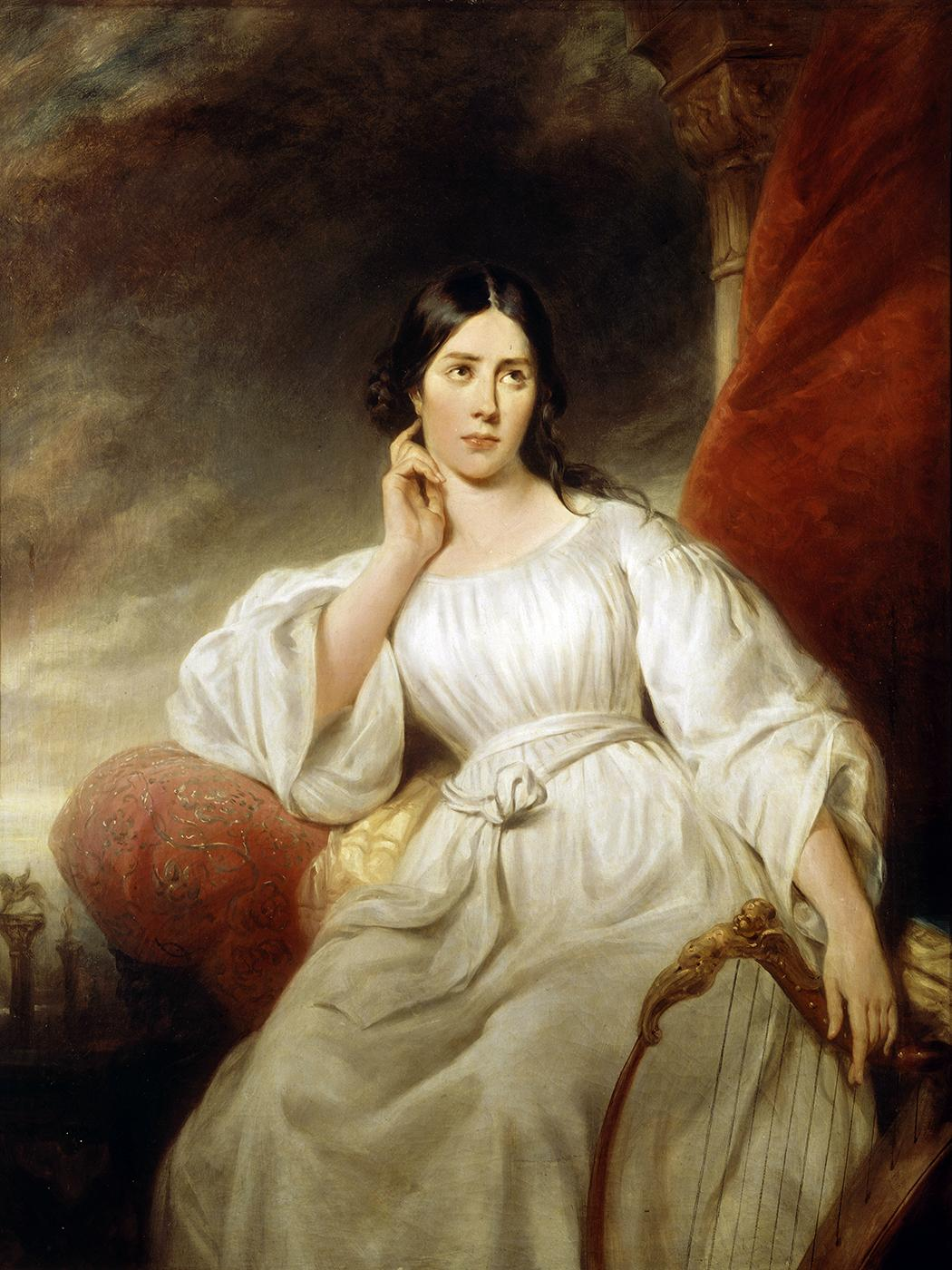
- Artist: Henri Decaisne
- Year: 1830
- Type: Oil on canvas, portrait painting
- Dimensions: 160 cm × 128 cm (63 in × 50 in)
- Location: Musée Carnavalet, Paris

Maria Malibran as Desdemona is an 1830 portrait painting by the Belgian artist Henri Decaisne depicting the Spanish singer Maria Malibran. Malibran is depicted in the role of Desdemona from Gioachino Rossini's opera Otello, itself based on William Shakespeare's play of the same title.

Decaisne was one of several French-based portraitists strongly influenced by the work of Thomas Lawrence in the 1820s. He submitted this work to the Royal Academy's Summer Exhibition of 1830 at Somerset House. It was also exhibited at the Salon of 1831 at the Louvre. Today it is in the collection of the Musée Carnavalet in Paris, having been acquired in 1924.

== Bibliography ==
- FitzLyon, April. Maria Malibran: Diva of the Romantic Age. Souvenir Press, 1987.
- Noon, Patrick & Bann, Stephen. Constable to Delacroix: British Art and the French Romantics. Tate, 2003.
