= Carlotta Chabert as Venus =

Painting by Francesco Hayez

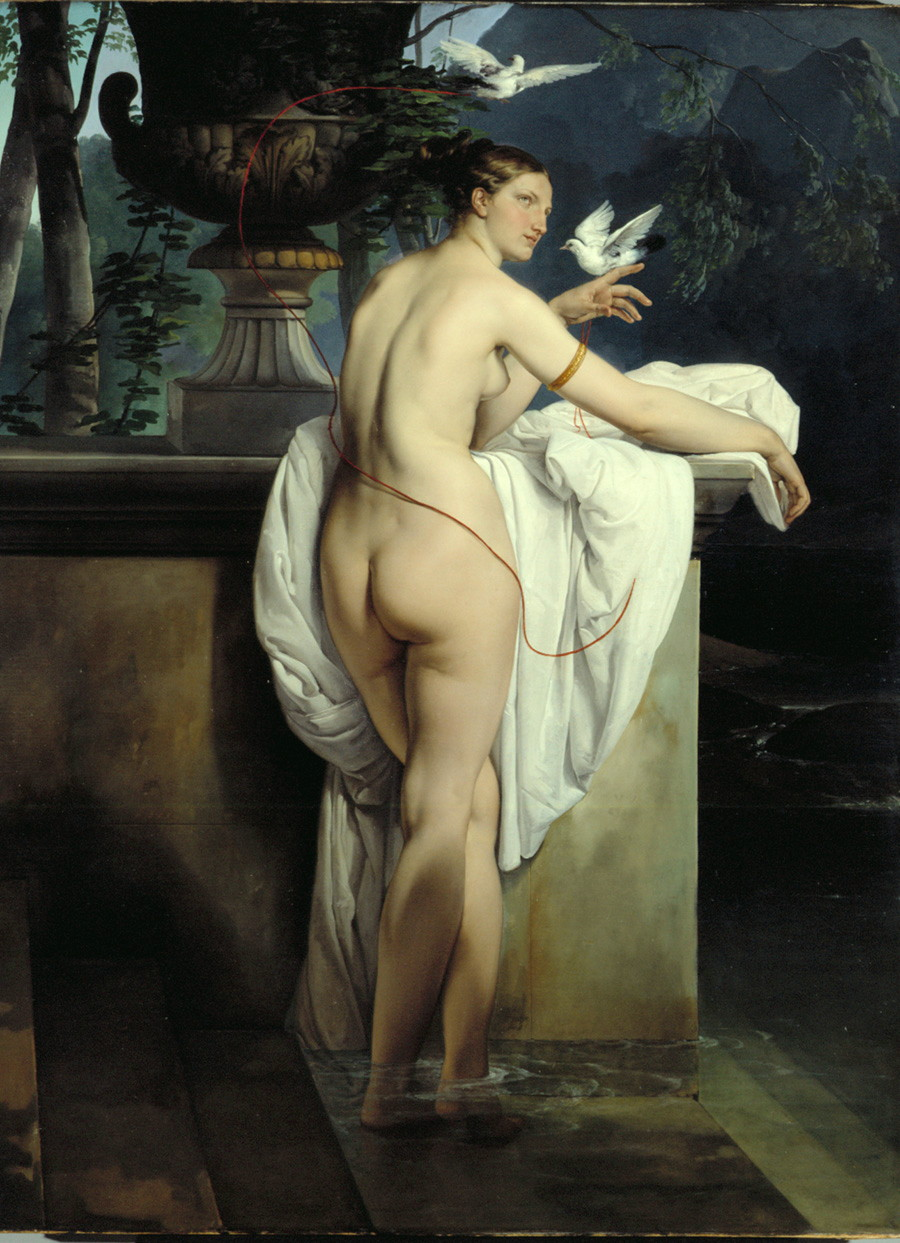
- Artist: Francesco Hayez
- Year: 1830
- Type: Oil on canvas, portrait painting
- Dimensions: 183 cm × 137 cm (72 in × 54 in)
- Location: Museum of Modern and Contemporary Art; Trento

Carlotta Chabert as Venus is an 1830 portrait painting by the Italian artist Francesco Hayez. It depicts the celebrated ballerina Carlotta Chabert in the role of the Roman Goddess Venus. Due to the presence of two doves in the painting it is also known as Venus with Doves. Today it is in the Museum of Modern and Contemporary Art in Trento.

== Bibliography ==
- Fabbri, Paolo. The Nude: Ideal and Reality : from Neoclassicism to Toda. ArtificioSkira, 2004.
- Lankheit, Klaus. Revolution und Restauration. DuMont, 1988.
- Rosenthal, Léon. Romanticism. Parkstone International, 2023.
