= Funeral of Sir Thomas Lawrence =

1830 painting by J. M. W. Turner

- Artist: J. M. W. Turner
- Year: 1830
- Medium: Watercolour and bodycolour on paper
- Dimensions: 56.1 cm × 76.9 cm (22.1 in × 30.3 in)
- Location: Tate Britain, London
- Accession: D25467
- Website: tate.org.uk/art/artworks/turner-funeral-of-sir-thomas-lawrence-a-sketch-from-memory-d25467

The Funeral of Sir Thomas Lawrence is an 1830 watercolour painting by the British artist J. M. W. Turner. It depicts the funeral at St. Paul's Cathedral in London of Sir Thomas Lawrence, the President of the Royal Academy and a friend and colleague of Turner. Lawrence died unexpectedly in January, and the painting captures the snow-covered landscape of his burial ceremony. Turner served as one of the pallbearers and sketched the scene from memory. It was exhibited at the Royal Academy's Summer Exhibition. It was later part of the 1856 Turner Bequest and is now in the collection of the Tate Britain.

== See also ==
- List of paintings by J. M. W. Turner

== Bibliography ==
- Finley, Gerald. Angel in the Sun: Turner's Vision of History. McGill-Queen's Press, 1999.
- Hamilton, James. Turner - A Life. Sceptre, 1998.
- Shanes, Eric. The Life and Masterworks of J.M.W. Turner. Parkstone International, 2012.
