= Henri Decaisne =

Belgian painter (1799–1852)

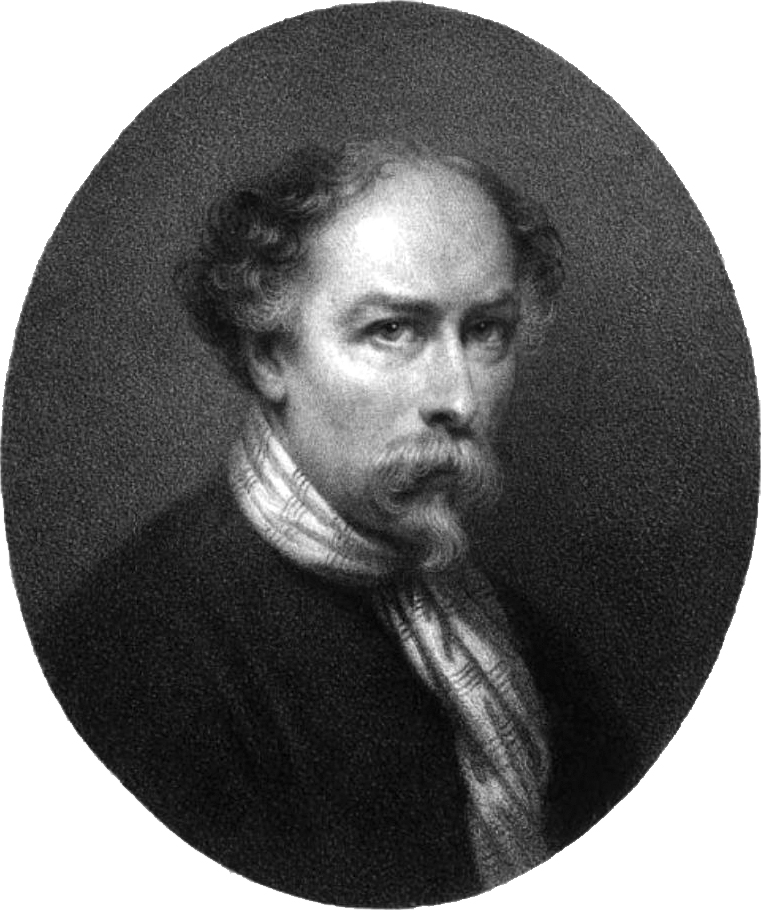
Self-portrait of Henri Decaisne (1850)

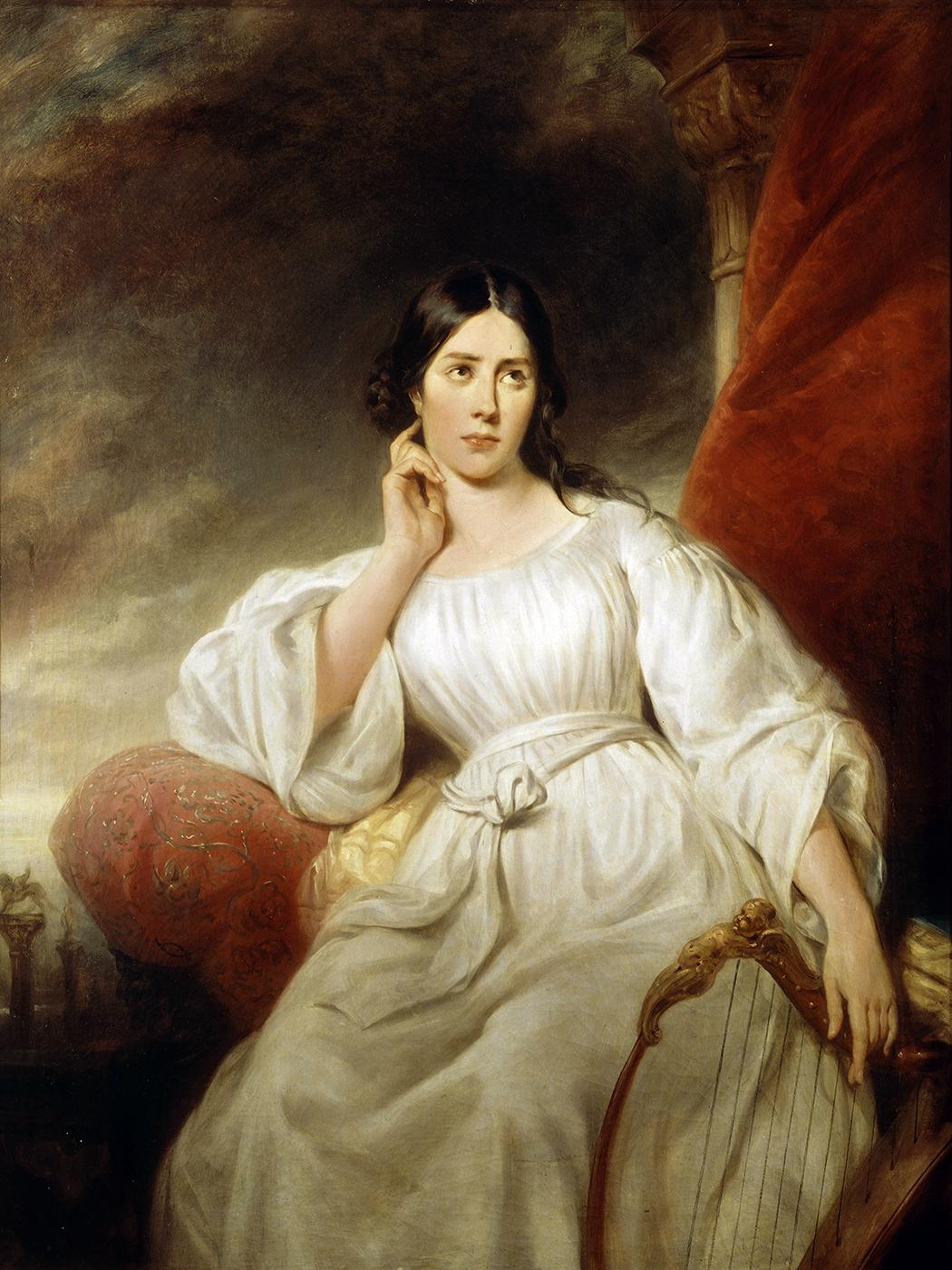
Maria Malibran as Desdemona (1830) Paris, Carnavalet Museum

Henri Decaisne (French pronunciation: [ɑ̃ʁi dəkɛn]; 27 January 1799 – 17 October 1852) was a Belgian historical and portrait painter.

== Biography ==
Decaisne was born at Brussels in 1799. As early as 1814 he began to study painting under François, and in 1818 upon the advice of David he went to Paris and entered the studio of Girodet, whence he removed to that of Gros. Several pictures by him are at Versailles; among them are the 'Entry of Charles VII into Rouen' (1838), and the 'Institution of the Order of St. John of Jerusalem' (1842). In 1839 he completed his colossal work, ' Les Belges Illustres'. He died in Paris in 1852.

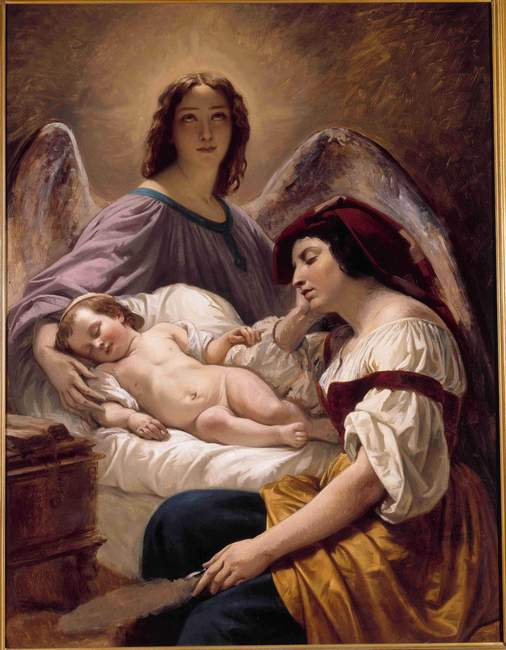
The Guardian Angel, ca. 1836, Royal Museum of Fine Arts, Antwerp

== Portraits ==
- The Queen of the Belgians. 1835.
- The Duke of Orleans. 1833.
- The Princess Clementina of Orleans. 1833.
- Maria Malibran as Desdemona. 1831. (pictured)
- Victor Schœlcher. 1833.
- Alphonse de Lamartine. 1839. (pictured)

== Historical and other subjects ==
- An Indian Family in Exile. 1824.
- Milton dictating 'Paradise Lost' to his Daughter. 1827.
- Charles I taking leave of his Children. 1827.
- Cromwell and his Daughter. 1829.
- Mater Dolorosa. 1835.
- Hagar in the Desert. 1836.
- The Guardian Angel. 1836. (His best work.) (pictured)
- Charity. 1839.
- The Adoration of the Shepherds. 1841.
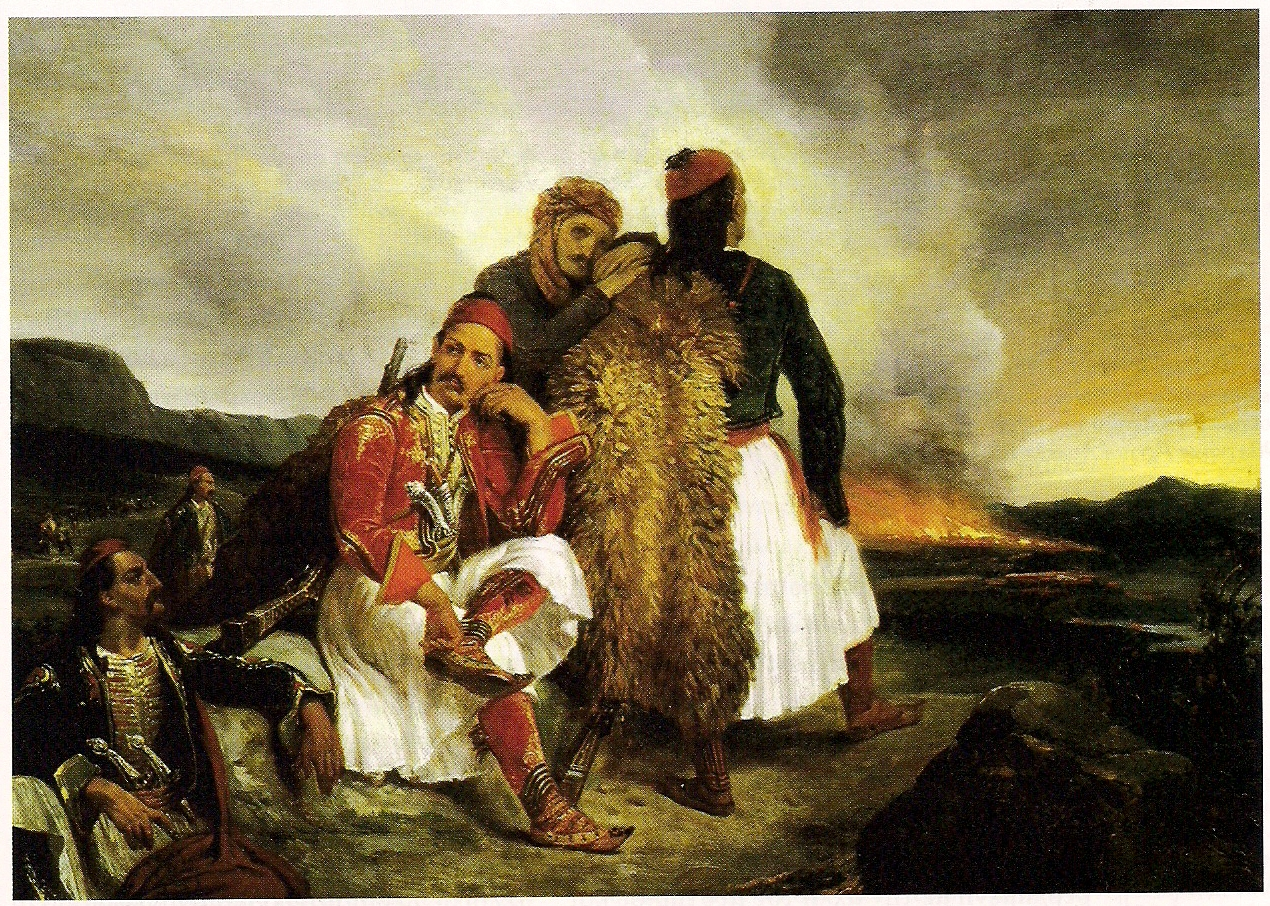
Failure of Military Operation, 1826, Benaki Museum, Athens)

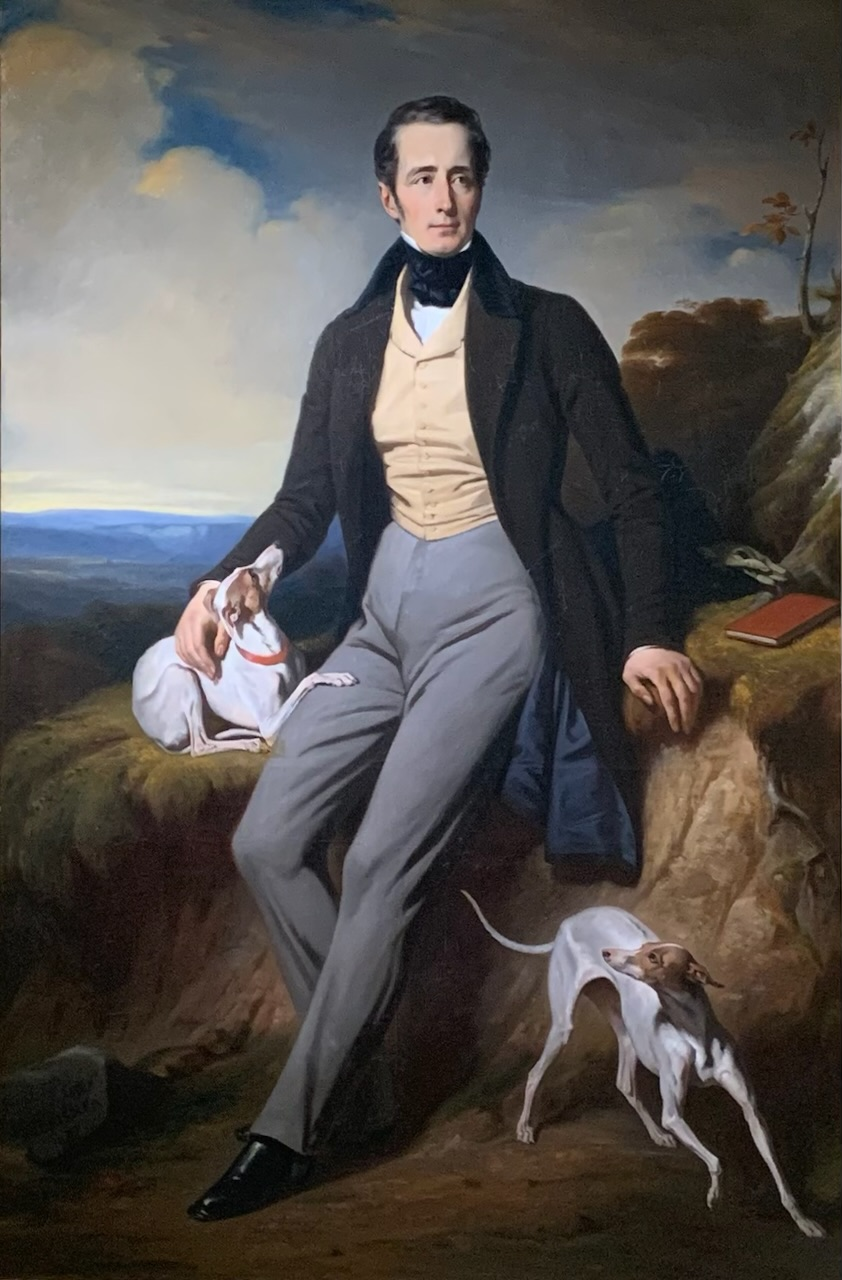
Alphonse de Lamartine, in the Museum of Fine Arts of Mâcon

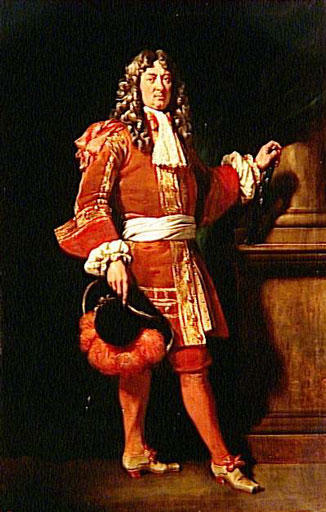
François de Blanchefort de Créquy de Bonne

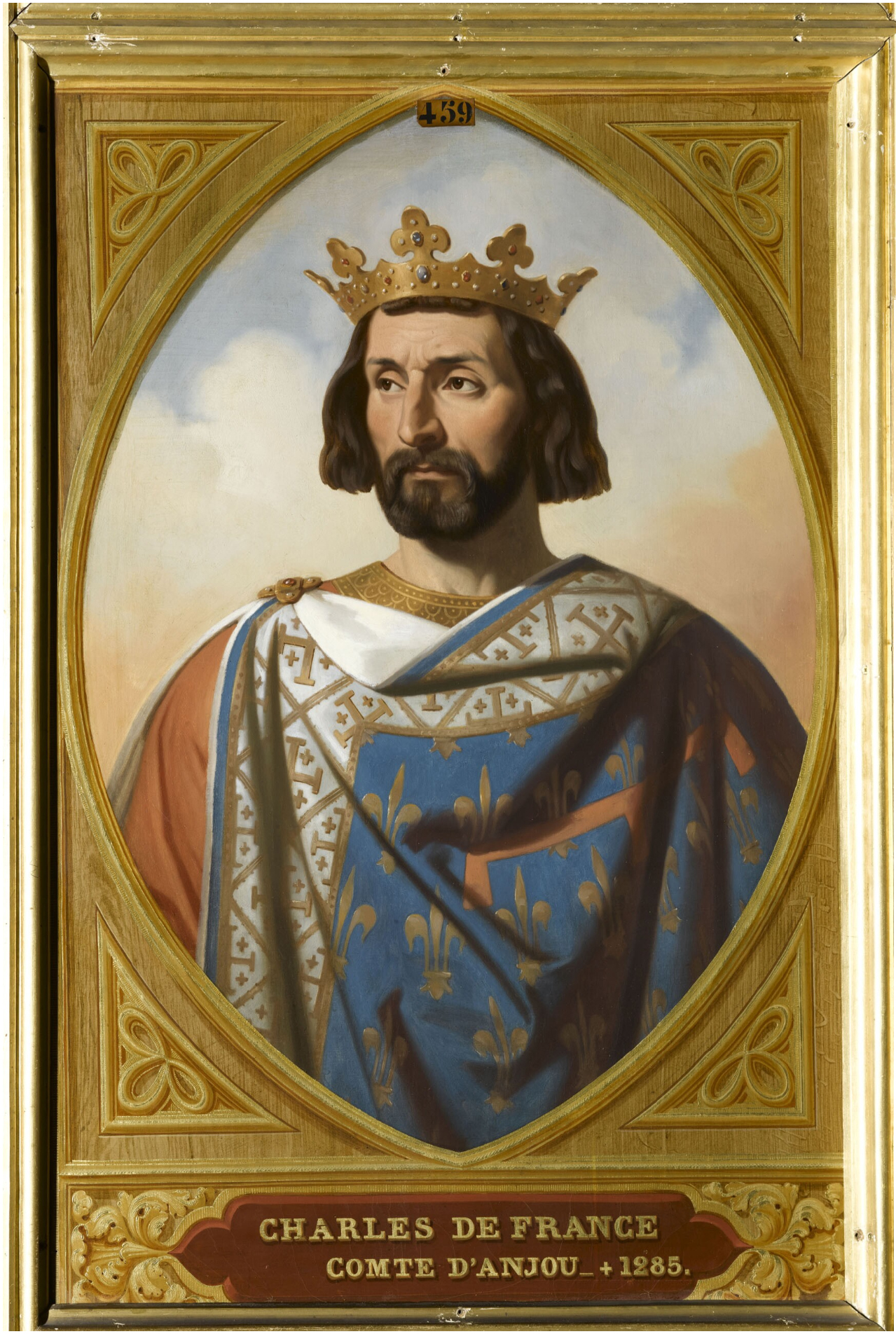
Charles de France (1220–1285), comte d'Anjou, 1844, Palace of Versailles

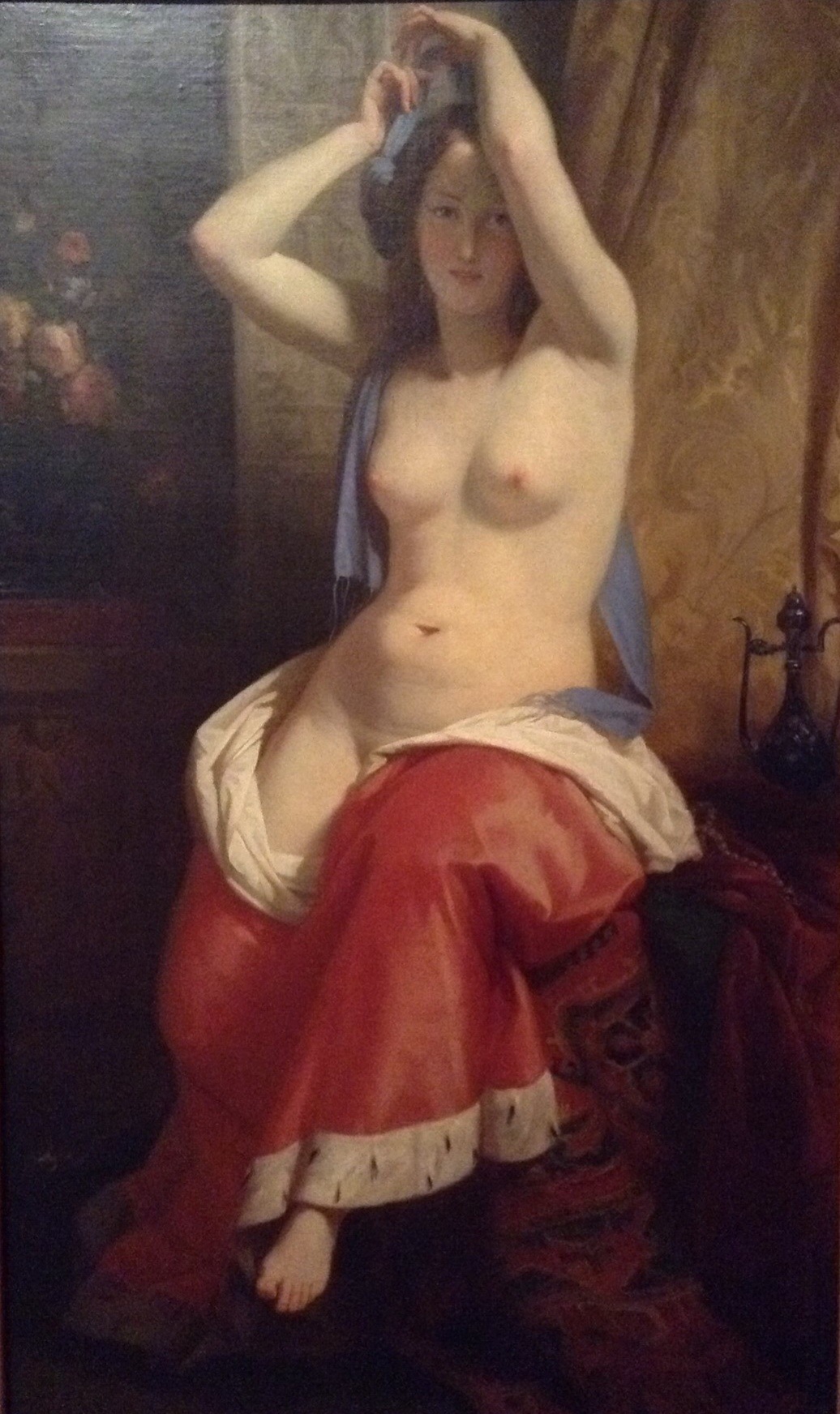
Odalisque, Museo Nacional de San Carlos, Mexico City

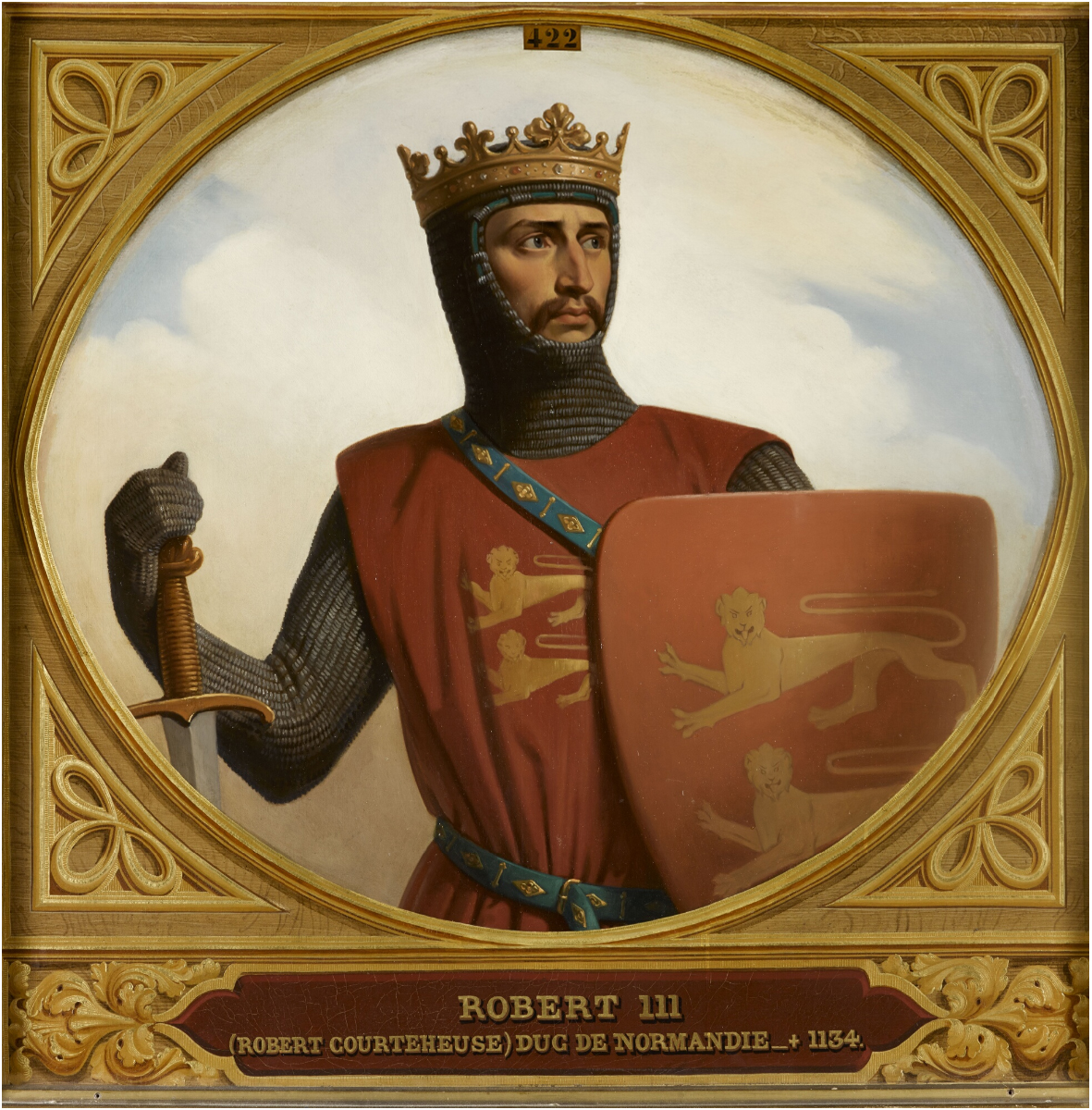
Robert Curthose, 1843
