= Franz Krüger =

German painter (1797–1857)

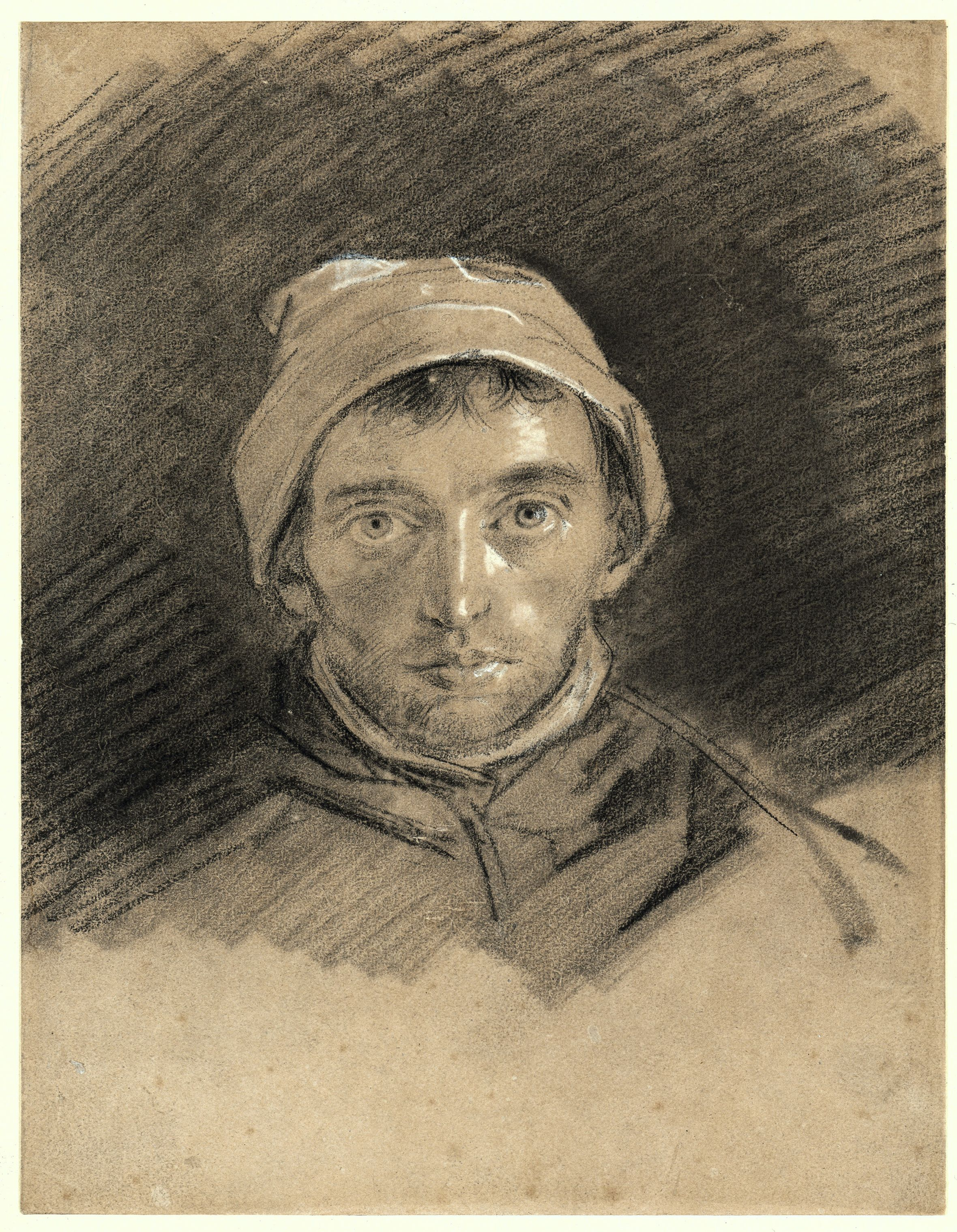
Self-Portrait, 1826, pencils on paper; Staatliche Museen zu Berlin

Franz Krüger (10 September 1797, in Großbadegast, Köthen, Anhalt – 21 January 1857, in Berlin), known as Pferde-Krüger ("Horse-Krüger"), was a German (Prussian) painter and lithographer. He was best known for his romantic and lively portraits and pictures of horses, which made him the most in demand military and portrait painter in Berlin. His paintings of military parades and hundreds of portraits led to him painting many of the "well-to-do" of the city.

== Life ==
Krüger was the son of a nobleman, and his friendship with the ornithologist Johann Friedrich Naumann from the neighbouring town of Ziebigk led him into animal painting. During his school days in Dessau, he came into contact with the landscape painter Karl Kolbe the Elder. Krüger studied in 1812–13 at the Prussian Academy of Arts in Berlin, and then continued to hone his skills independently by drawing from life, particularly in the Prussian royal stables. In 1818, his military and hunting paintings were exhibited at the academy for the first time. His painting of Prince Augustus of Prussia (a son of Prince Augustus Ferdinand of Prussia) and Count Neidhardt von Gneisenau laid the foundations for his fame as a portraitist and led to further depictions of the royal family.

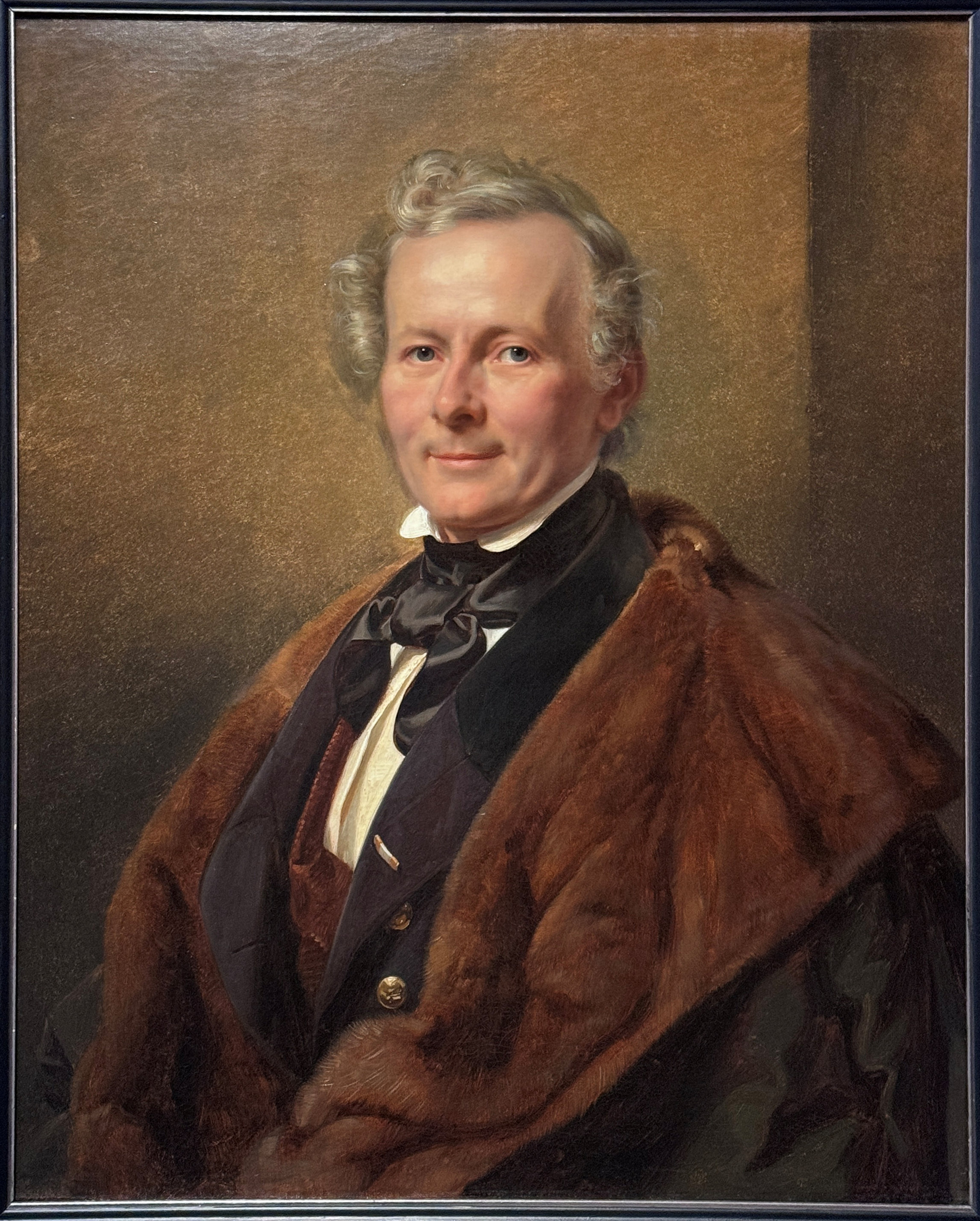
Portrait of councillor Bennewitz, ca. 1849, Anhaltische Gemäldegalerie Dessau

In 1825, he was named a Royal Professor and a full member of the Academy of Arts. Many trips to the Russian court in St. Petersburg and the courts in Hanover and Schwerin followed. During a study trip to Paris in 1846, he met Eugène Delacroix. After the revolutions of 1848, he returned to Dessau, but in 1855, he took part in the World Exhibition in Paris.

In 1825, he married an artist called Johanna Eunicke. She died in 1856. He died the year after, and was buried at Dorotheenstadt cemetery in Berlin.

One of his students was the animal painter Carl Steffeck.

== Selected works ==
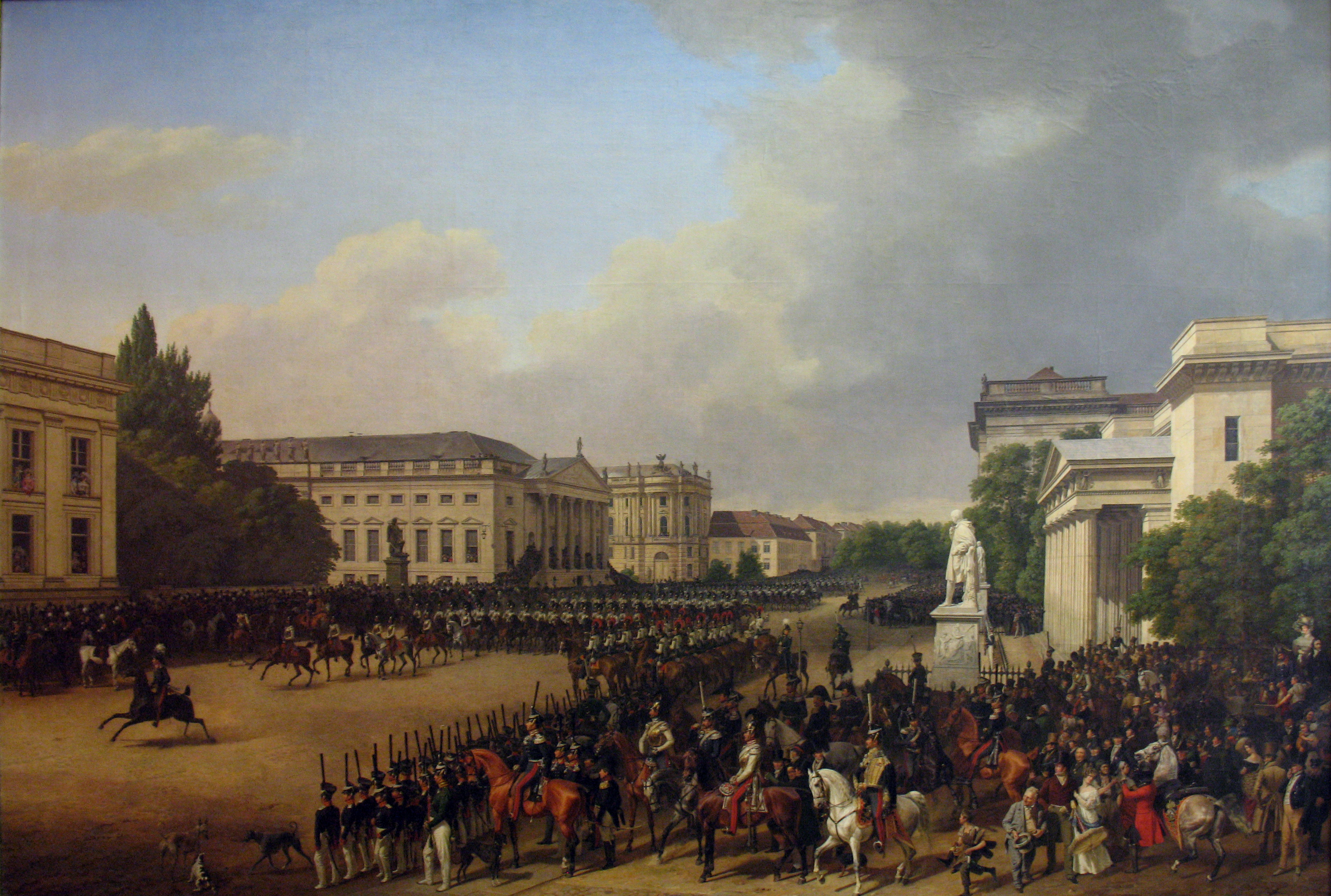
Parade in the Opernplatz in Berlin, 1830, Alte Nationalgalerie

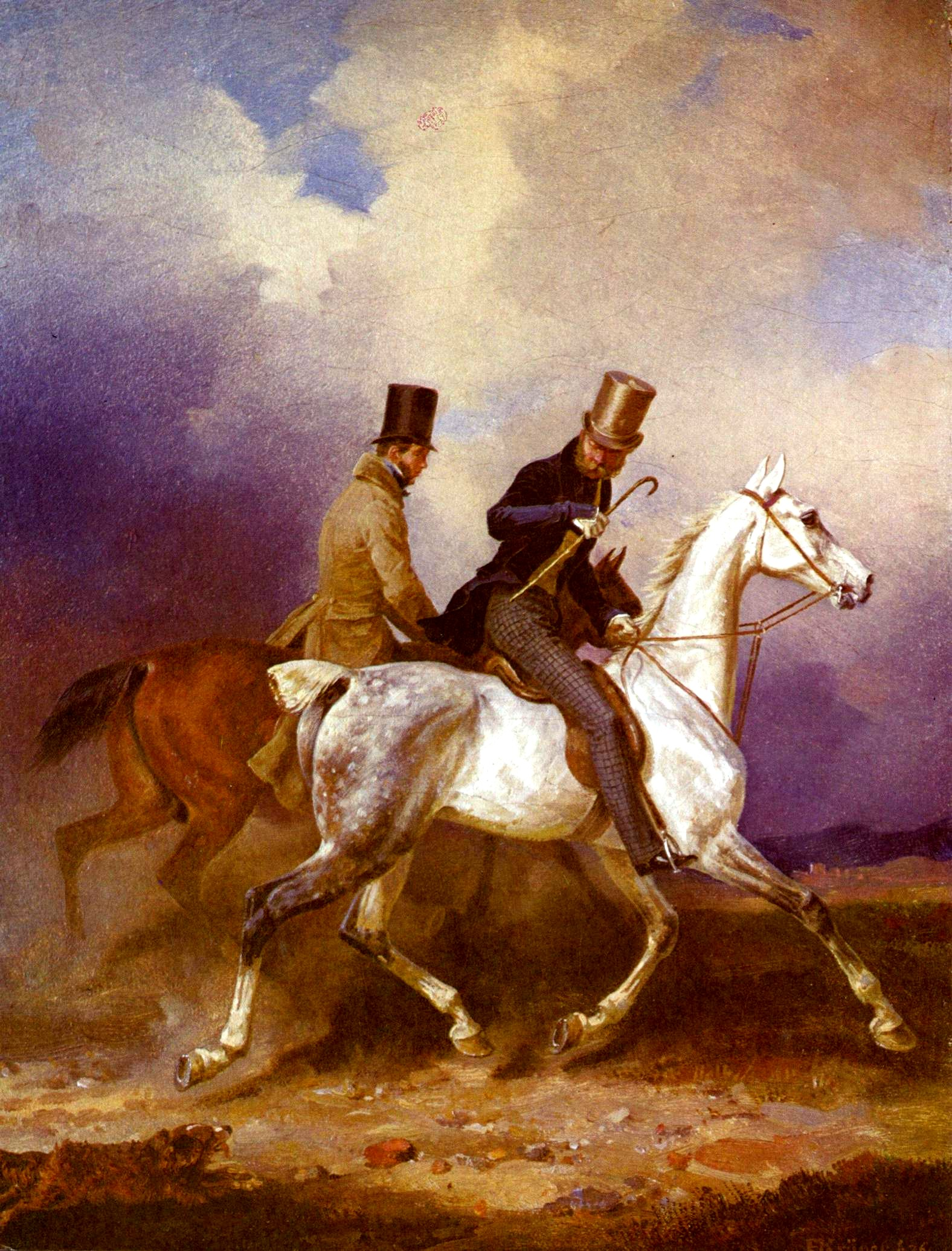
Franz Krüger: Prince Wilhelm of Prussia (later Kaiser-King Wilhelm I) with painter, 1836 (Alte Nationalgalerie)

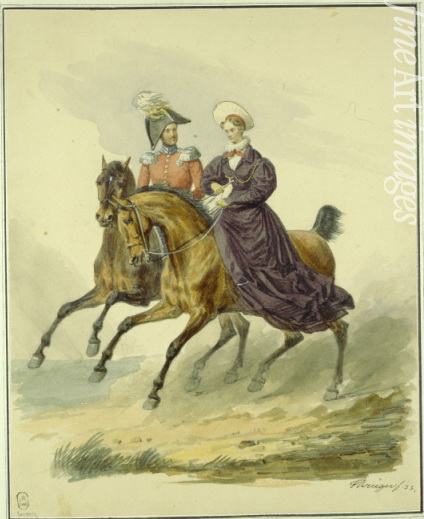
Emperor Nicholas I and Empress Alexandra Fyodorovna (Russian Museum)

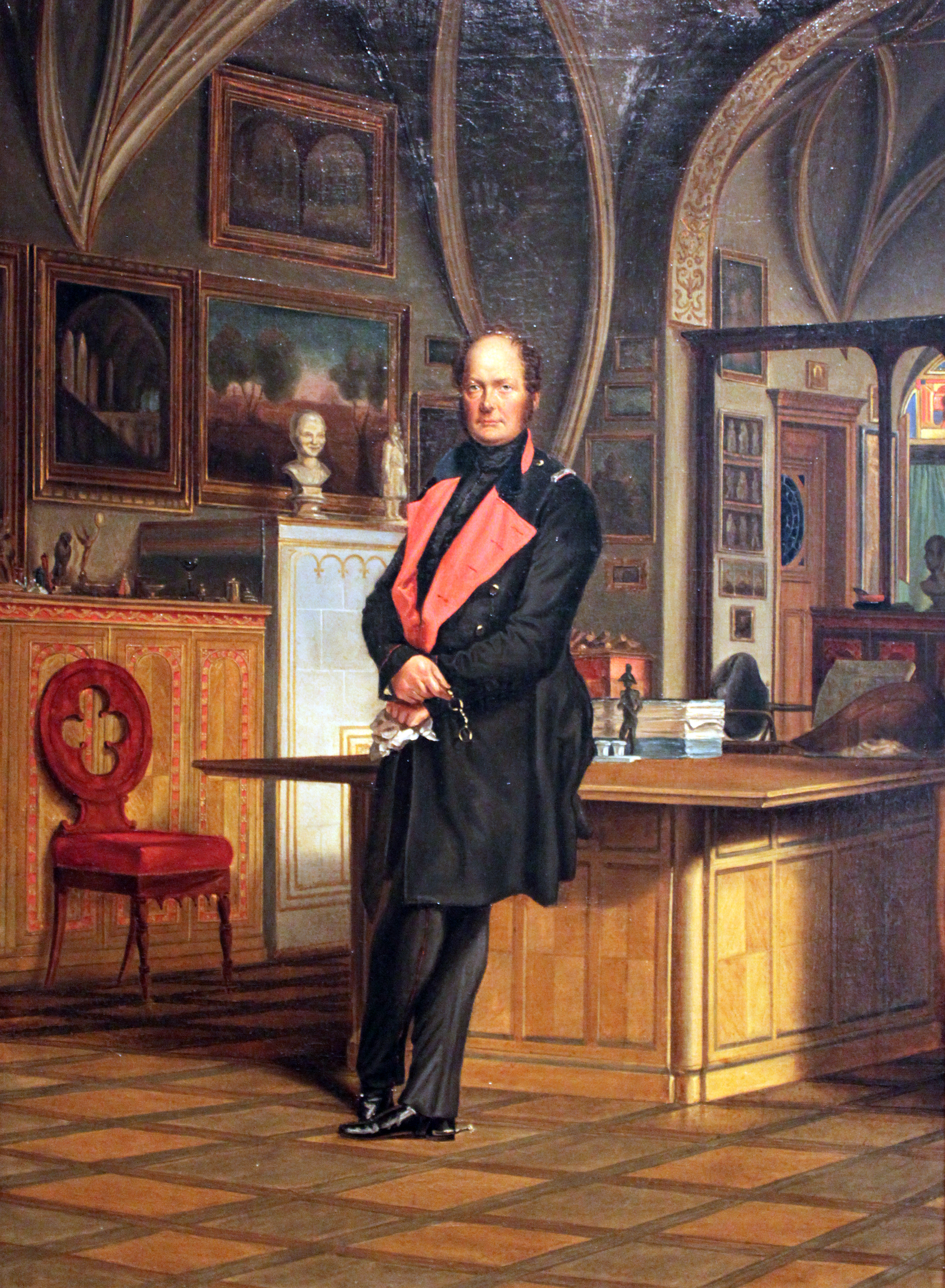
Friedrich Wilhelm IV in his Study, 1846, Deutsches Historisches Museum

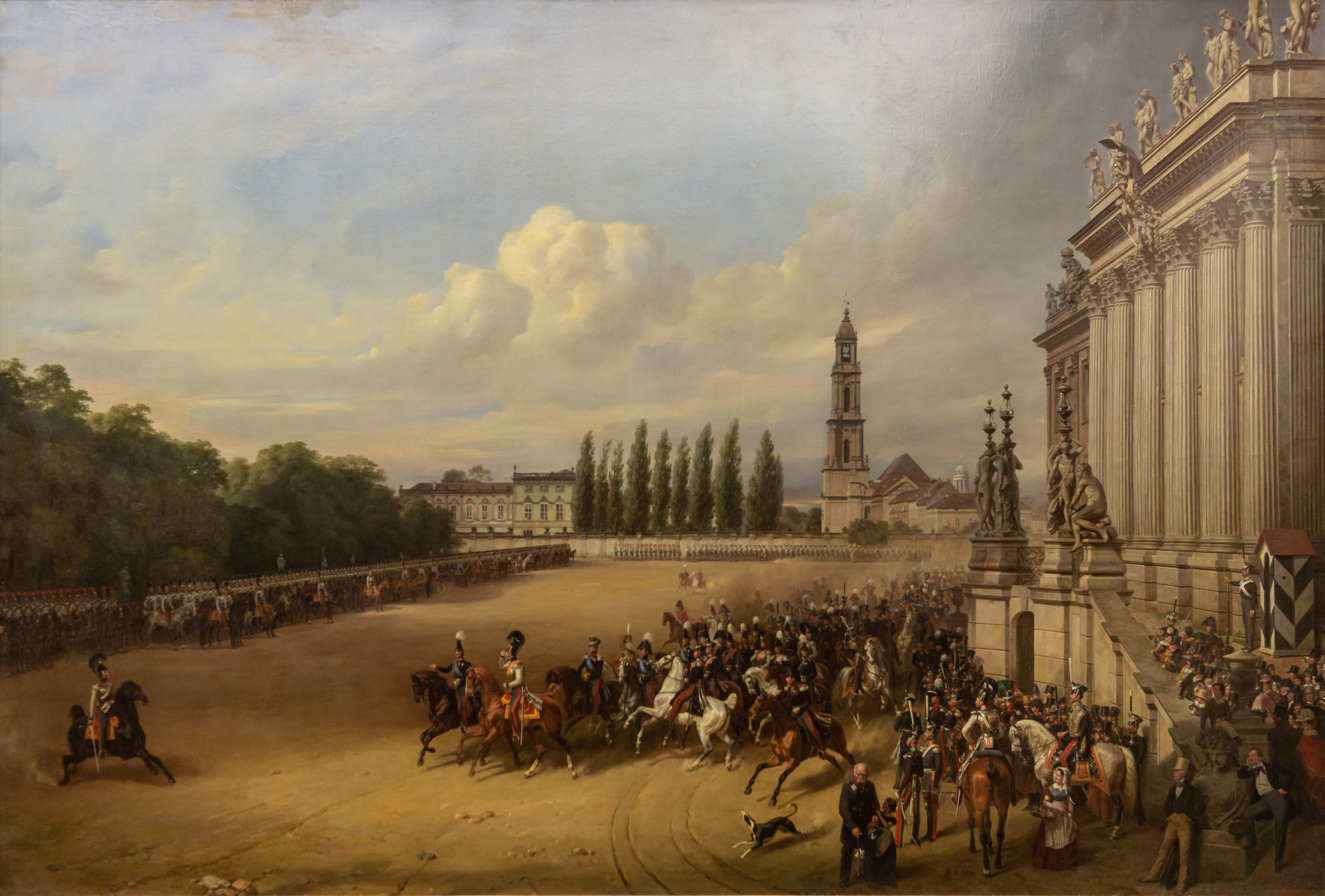
Parade in Potsdam in 1817, 1849, Alte Nationalgalerie

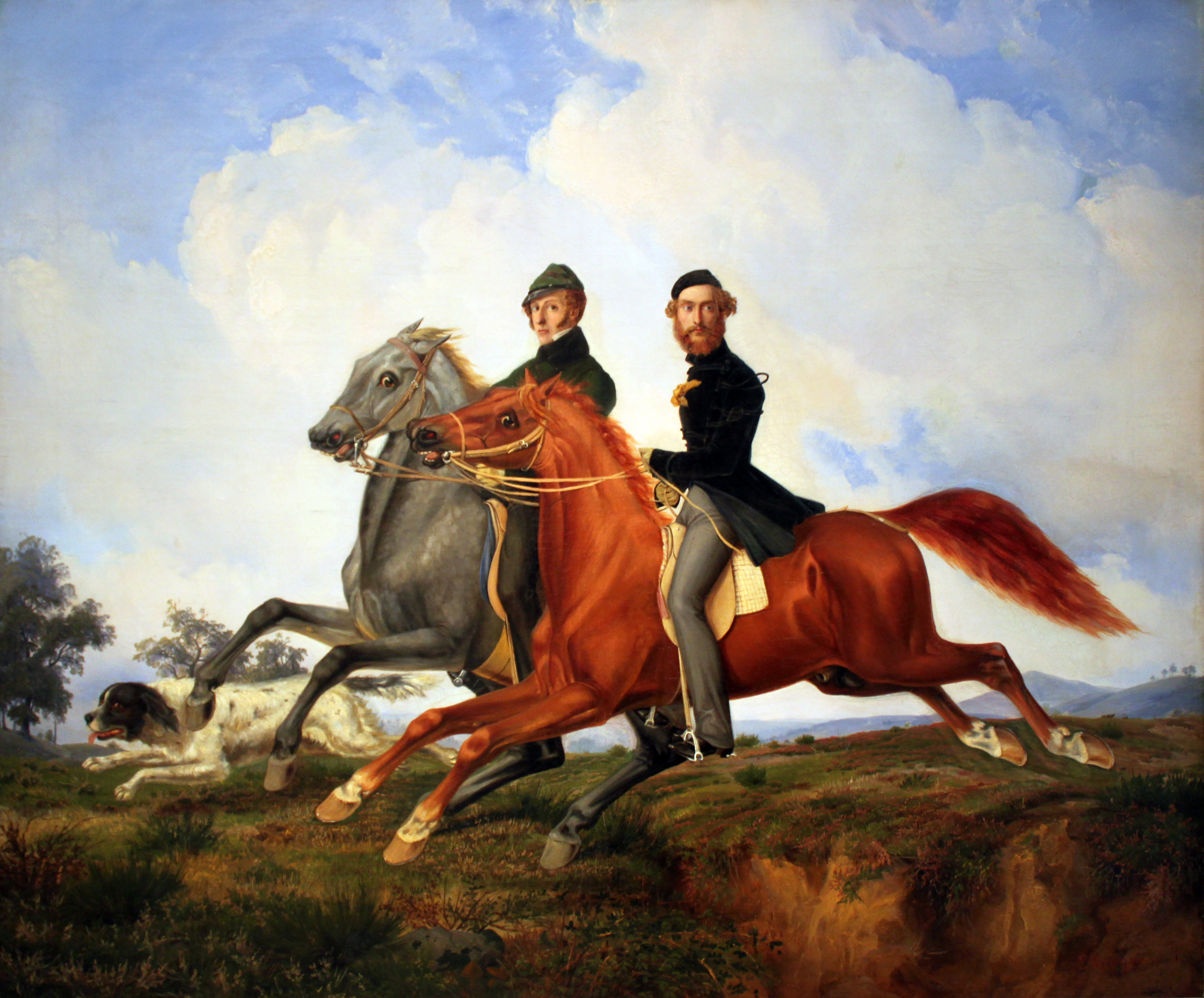
Two riders galloping, 1851, Germanisches Nationalmuseum

== Literature ==
- Max Osborn: Franz Krüger. Edited and with a foreword by Kerstin Englert. Berlin: Gebr. Mann, 1997 ISBN 3-7861-1913-9 (New issue of a book of 1910)
