= Georges Michel (painter) =

French painter (1763–1843)

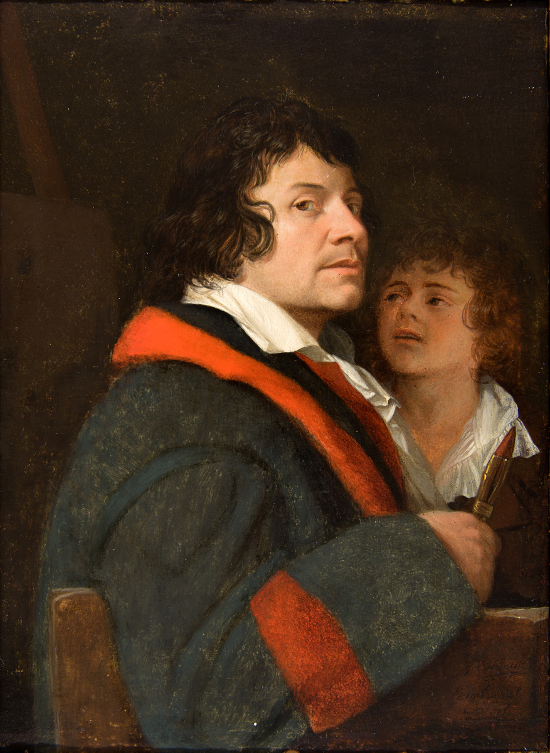
Georges Michel and His Son (1797), by Jean-Marie Degault (c.1763-1818)

Georges Bernard Michel (12 January 1763, Paris – 8 June 1843, Paris) was a French landscape painter. His works are considered to be a precursor of the Barbizon School.

== Biography ==
His father was an employee at Les Halles, a large marketplace in the central part of Paris. Thanks to support from the local Fermier Général, he was able to take lessons from a history painter named Leduc, which enabled him to gain admission to the Académie de Saint-Luc. There, he studied with Claude-Joseph Vernet. He would later take lessons from Nicolas-Antoine Taunay. Over the next few years, he earned a meagre living as a drawing teacher.

In 1789, he accompanied the Duke of Guiche to Germany and met Jean-Baptiste-Pierre Lebrun, who would provide him with the means to earn a decent, steady income, restoring paintings and making copies of 17th-century Dutch landscapes. He married his first wife that same year, and they would have five children.

He exhibited his own paintings at the Salon for the first time in 1791. Although he continued to exhibit there regularly for twenty years, he apparently failed to achieve much recognition. In 1813 he opened a shop for selling his works, as well as curios and furniture. It closed in 1820. During this time, he obtained the patronage of Jean-Baptiste Roslin, Baron d'Ivry (1775-1839), who was an amateur landscape and history painter.

He was stricken with paralysis and died in 1843, aged eighty. His grave is in the Cemetery of Montparnasse. He had held no exhibitions since 1821, and was largely forgotten.

Most of his work concentrates on rural landscapes in the area around Paris. In keeping with his work as a copyist, his early paintings were influenced by Dutch landscape painters such as Jacob van Ruisdael and Meindert Hobbema. Toward the end of the 19th-century, his paintings were rediscovered by the art dealer Paul Durand-Ruel, who promoted them throughout Europe.

The first large exhibition of his work was presented by the Galerie Charpentier in 1927. Today his works are found in museums around the world, including The Metropolitan Museum of Art, Portland Art Museum, Vanderbilt University Gallery, Strasbourg Musée des Beaux-Arts, Victoria and Albert Museum, and many others.

== Selected paintings ==
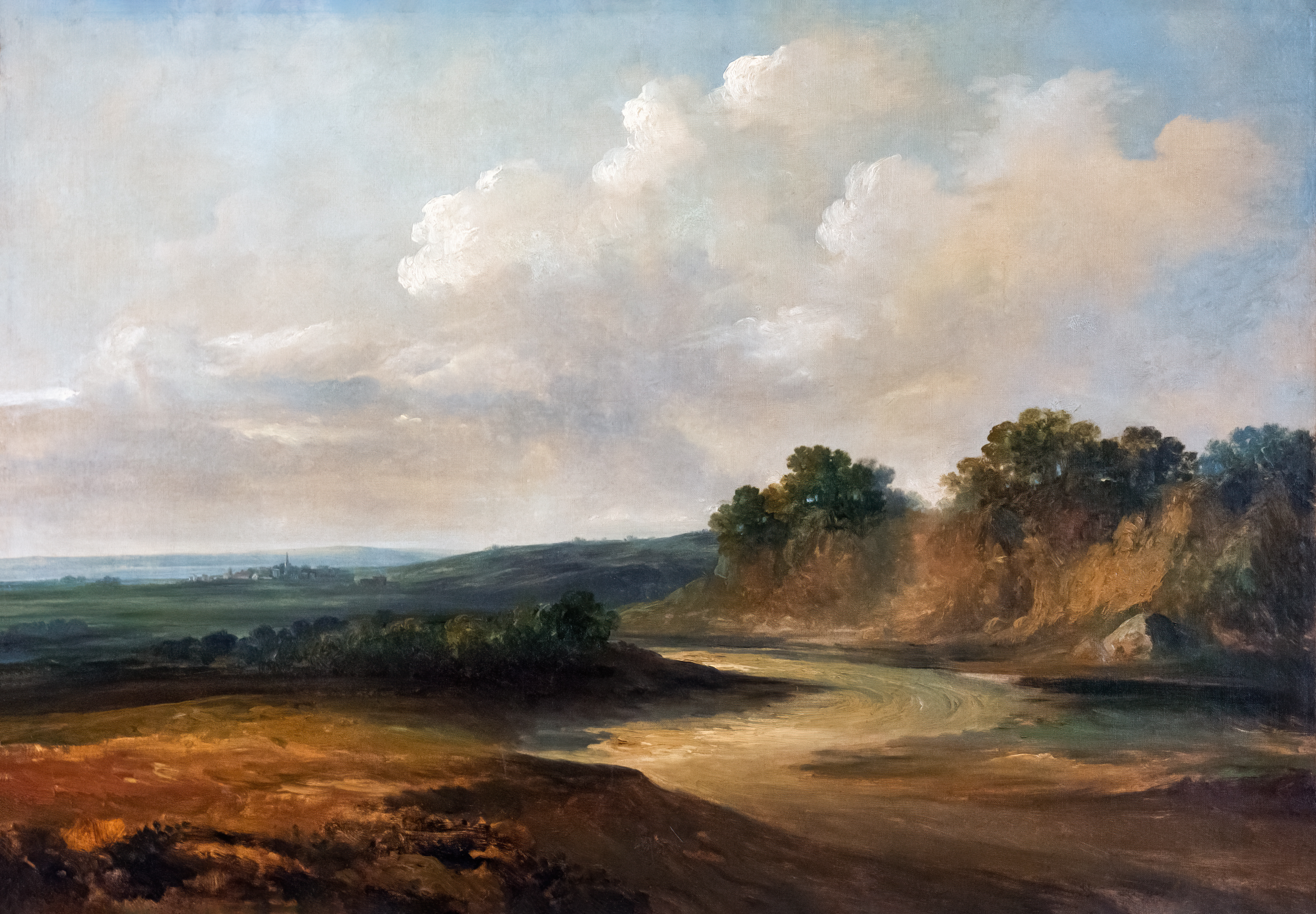
The Turning Road

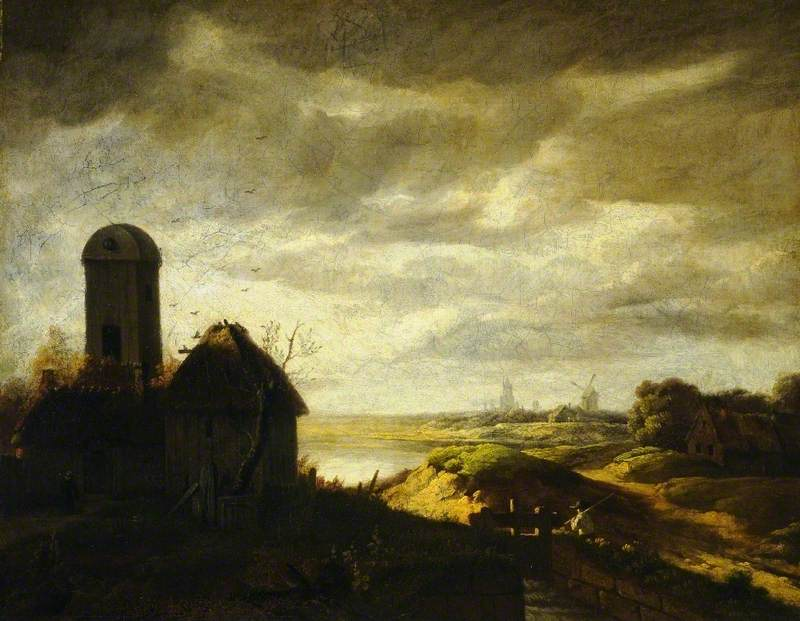
Landscape with Windmills

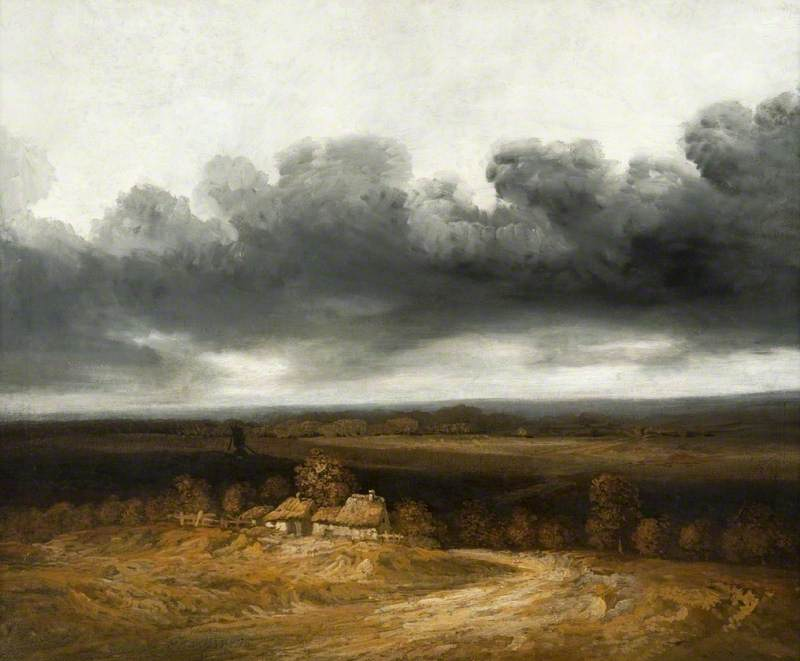
Landscape with Farms

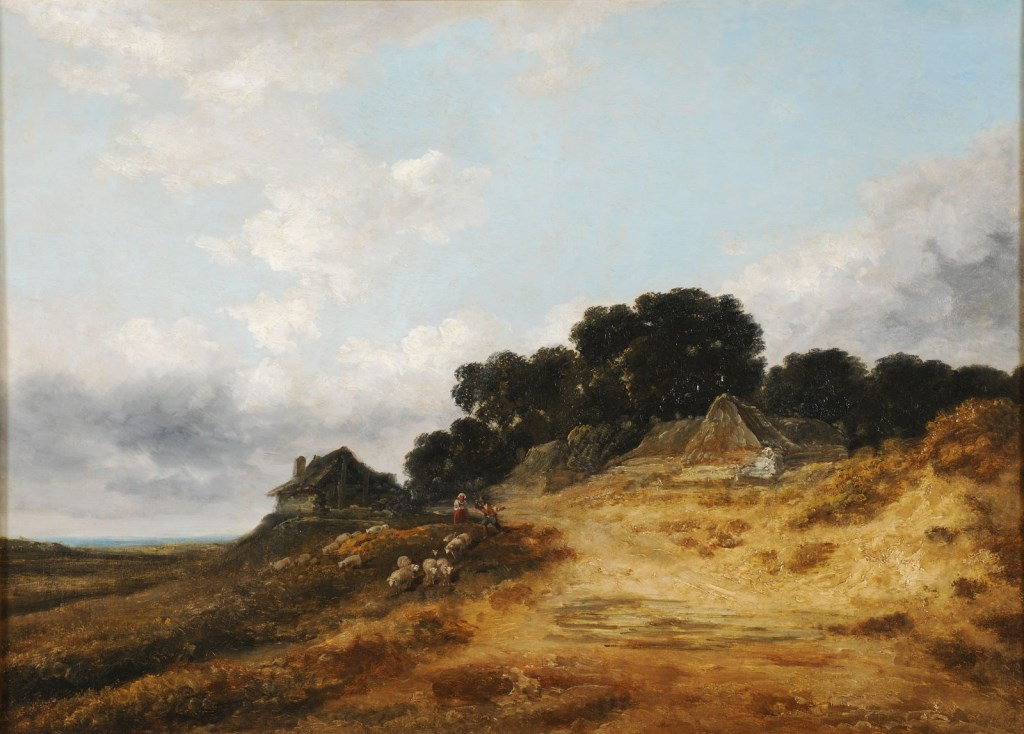
Thatched Cottage on the Edge of a Wood.

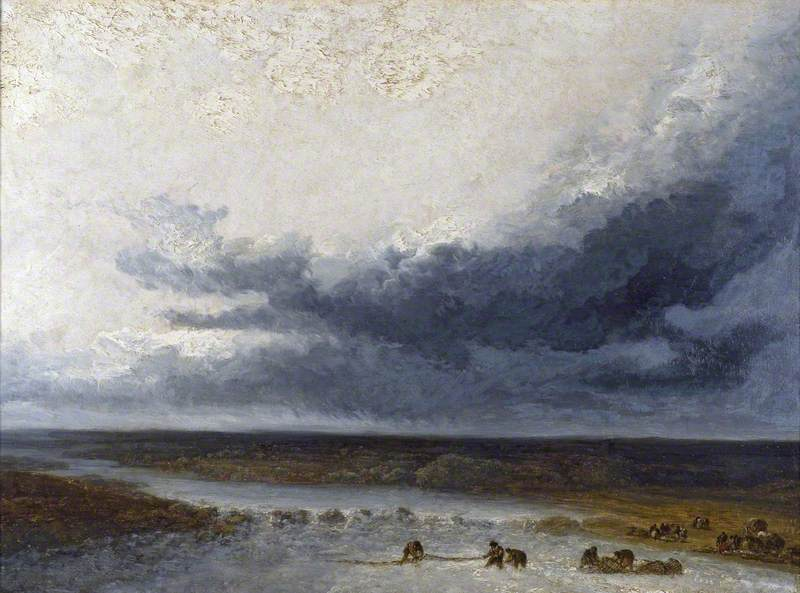
Landscape with Fishermen
