= Cordovan (color) =

Shade of dark red

Color coordinates
- Hex triplet: #893F45
- sRGB^{B} (r, g, b): (137, 63, 69)
- HSV (h, s, v): (355°, 54%, 54%)
- CIELCh_{uv} (L, C, h): (37, 51, 8°)
- Source: Pantone Color Planner
- ISCC–NBS descriptor: Dark red
- B: Normalized to [0–255] (byte)

Cordovan is a rich, dark shade of burgundy with a hint of rose. Cordovan takes its name from the city of Córdoba, Spain, where the production of cordovan leather was first practiced by the Visigoths in the seventh century. The term cordovan has come to describe the color of clothing – leather in particular; in this sense, the use of cordovan overlaps with that of oxblood.

The first recorded use of cordovan as a color name in English was in 1925.

== See also ==
- Shades of red
- List of colors
