= Hunt effect (color) =

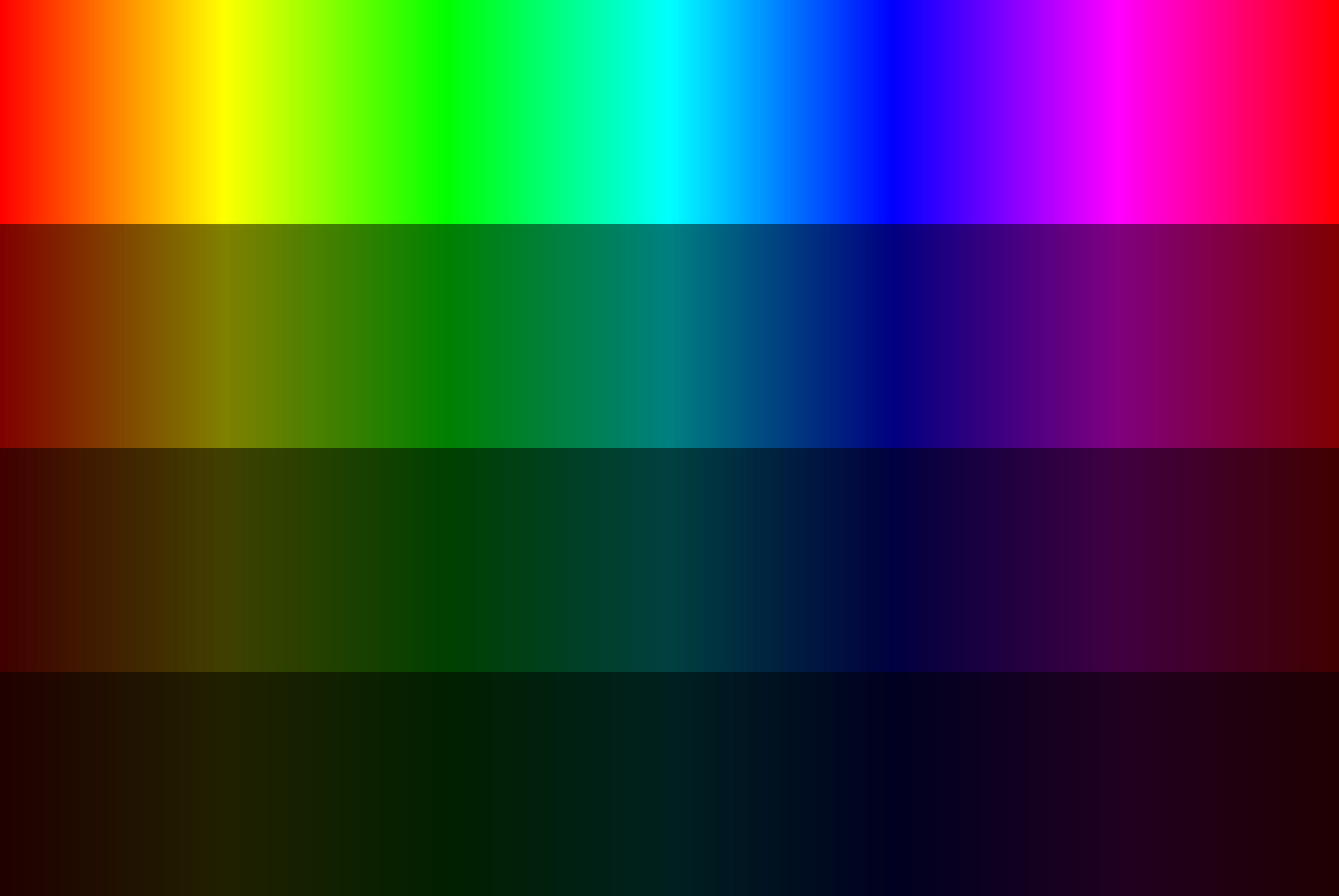
In this illustration of the Hunt effect, the four horizontal bands contain the same colors (hue and saturation), yet the brighter bands appear more colorful than the darker ones.

The Hunt effect or luminance-on-colorfulness effect comprises an increase in colorfulness of a color with increasing luminance. The effect was first described by R. W. G. Hunt in 1952.

Hunt noted that this effect occurs at low luminance levels. At higher luminance, he noted a hue shift of colors to be more blue with higher luminance, which is now known as the Bezold–Brücke effect. The Hunt effect is related to the Helmholtz–Kohlrausch effect, where a saturated stimulus is seen to be brighter than less saturated or achromatic stimuli.

== See also ==
- Opponent process
- Purkinje shift
- Abney effect
