= Oxblood =

Color considered to be a dark shade of red

Color coordinates
- Hex triplet: #4A0000
- sRGB^{B} (r, g, b): (74, 0, 0)
- HSV (h, s, v): (0°, 100%, 29%)
- CIELCh_{uv} (L, C, h): (12, 41, 12°)
- ISCC–NBS descriptor: Deep red
- B: Normalized to [0–255] (byte)

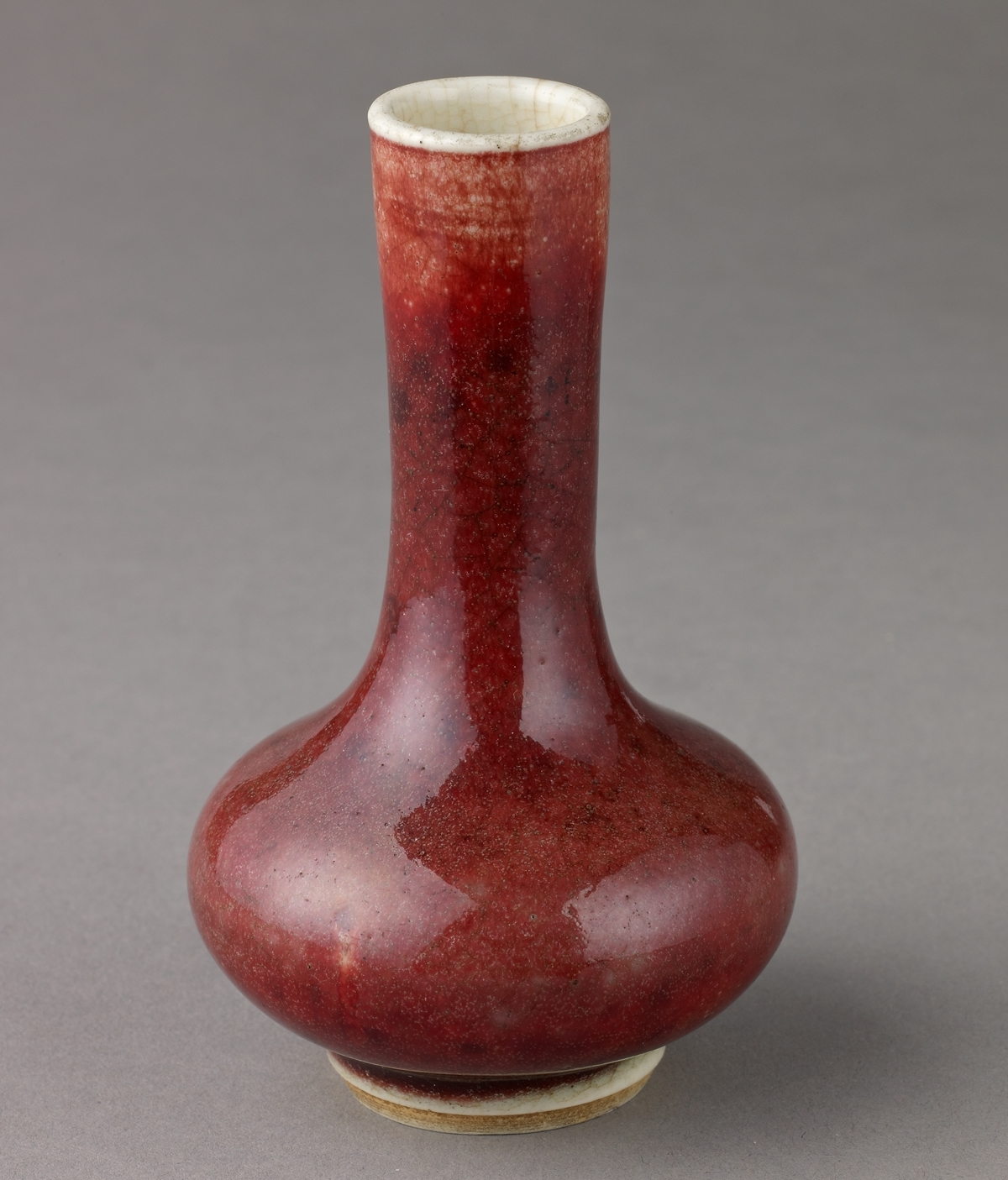
Small 18th-century vase with sang de boeuf glaze

Oxblood or ox-blood is a dark shade of maroon, and is one of the darkest shades of red. It resembles burgundy, but has less purple and more dark brown hues. The French term sang-de-bœuf, or sang de bœuf, with the same meaning (but also "ox blood") is used in various contexts in English, but especially in pottery, where sang de boeuf glaze in the color is a classic ceramic glaze in Chinese ceramics.

The name is often used in fashion, especially for shoes. The term oxblood can be used to describe a range of colors from red to reddish-purple to nearly black with red, brown and blue undertones.

== Origin ==
The first use of the term oxblood as a color name in the English language dates back to 1695–1705. The name is derived from the color of the blood of an ox. The ox blood was used as a pigment to dye fabric, leather and paint. It is most commonly described as a dark red with purple and brown undertones. The blood would change from a bright red to a darker, oxidized, more brown-red as it aged.

The color is used in fashion terms. It was popular and the name was used frequently in the 2012 Fall/Winter fashion season.

== In modern fashion ==
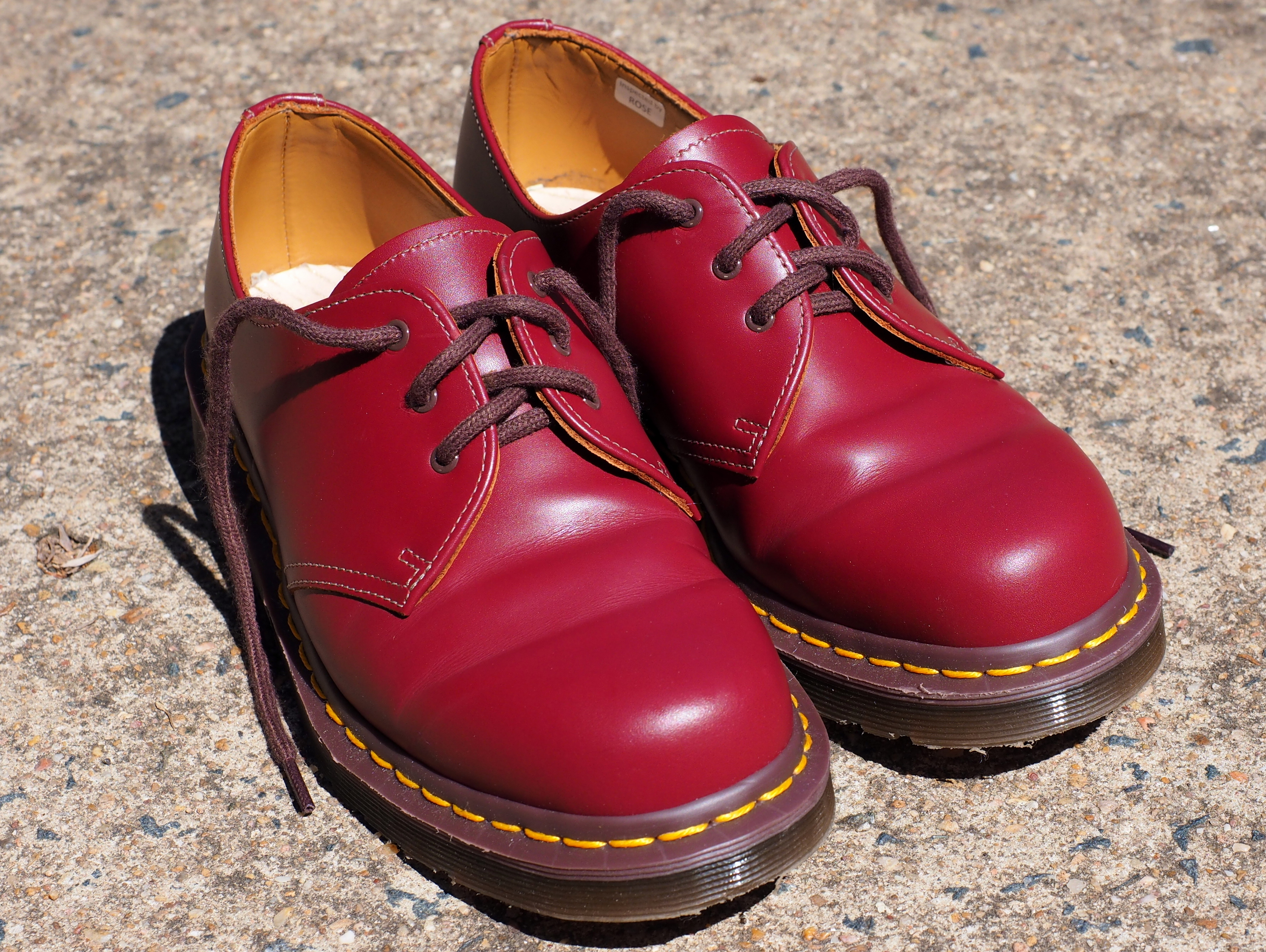
A pair of oxblood-colour Dr. Martens shoes

Oxblood is a relatively common color for leather shoes. It is sometimes called "cordovan" although this term more properly refers to a particular type of horse leather. During the Fall/Winter fashion seasons of 2012 and 2013, oxblood was one of the commonly used colors. Oxblood lipstick was popular, as well as oxblood-colored apparel and accessories. In an article on the oxblood trend, Lucky Magazine suggested that people are now "dismissing words like burgundy from their vocabularies", adding that the word "oxblood" might be more on-trend than the color itself.

== London Underground ==
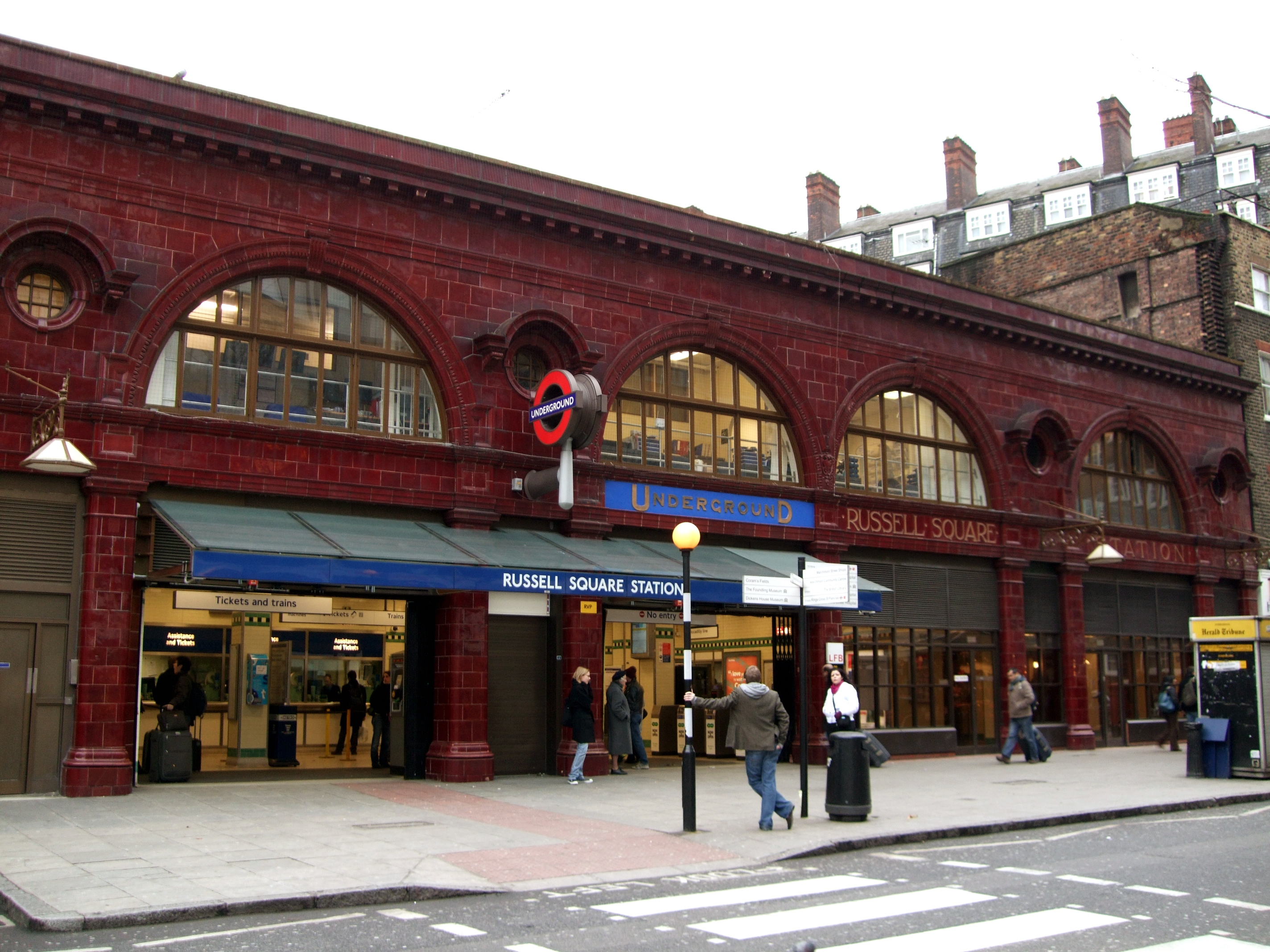
Russell Square station, Piccadilly line, with the oxblood tiles used on many London Underground station buildings.

From 1903, the English architect Leslie Green used an industrial, solid, sang de boeuf glaze on the glazed architectural terra-cotta tiles for the exteriors of the stations of a large part of the London Underground system, which was then divided between a number of commercial companies. His employer, the Underground Electric Railways Company of London was building the Great Northern, Piccadilly and Brompton Railway, the Baker Street and Waterloo Railway and the Charing Cross, Euston and Hampstead Railway, which are now respectively sections of the Piccadilly line, Bakerloo line and Northern line. The Leeds Fireclay Company made the tiles.
