= Tint, shade and tone =

Mixture of a color with white or black

Some tints and shades of blue

In color theory, a tint is a mixture of a color with white, which increases lightness, while a shade is a mixture with black, which increases darkness. A tone is produced either by mixing a color with gray, or by both tinting and shading. Mixing a color with any neutral color (black, gray, and white) reduces the chroma, or colorfulness, while the perceived hue can be affected slightly (see Abney effect and Bezold-Brücke shift).

In the graphic arts, especially printmaking and drawing, "tone" has a different meaning, referring to areas of continuous color, produced by various means, as opposed to the linear marks made by an engraved or drawn line.

In common language, the term shade can be generalized to encompass any varieties of a particular color, whether technically they are shades, tints, tones, or slightly different hues. Meanwhile, the term tint can be generalized to refer to any lighter or darker variation of a color (e.g. "tinted windows").

When mixing colored light (additive color models), the achromatic mixture of spectrally balanced red, green, and blue (RGB) is always white, not gray or black. In colorants, such as the pigments in paint mixtures, a balanced mixture of complementaries, or a balanced mixture of three or more colors, will result in a color that is darker and lower in chroma and saturation, than the parent colors. This moves the mixed color toward a neutral color—a gray or near-black.

The Color Triangle depicting tint, shade, and tone was proposed in 1937 by Faber Birren.

== In art ==
It is common among some artistic painters to darken a paint color by adding black paint—producing colors called shades—or to lighten a color by adding white—producing colors called tints. However, this is not always the best way for representational painting, since one result is for colors to also shift in their hues. For instance, darkening a color by adding black can cause hue shifts towards rose or green (see Bezold-Brücke shift). Lightening a color by adding white can cause even more noticeable hue shifts (see Abney effect). Another practice when darkening a color is to use its opposite, or complementary, color (e.g. violet-purple added to yellowish-green) in order to neutralize it. When lightening a color this hue shift can be corrected with the addition of a small amount of an adjacent color to bring the hue of the mixture back in line with the parent color (e.g. adding a small amount of orange to a mixture of red and white will correct the shift of this mixture towards pink, that is, it will correct the Abney effect).

A 3D extension of the color wheel: the color sphere (see color solid). Colors in the axis passing through black, grey, and white are in the achromatic axis (i.e. they have no chroma). Maximum chroma colors of different hues are called nuances. Colors of the same hue and saturation as a maximum chroma color, but of different lightness, are called tints and shades. Colors of the same hue and lightness, but of different saturation, are called tones.

== See also ==
- Ambient light
- Contrast (vision)
- Earth tone
- Image gradient
- Lightness
- Pastel (color)
