= Hunt effect =

The Hunt Effect refers to two unrelated effects:

- The Weekend effect of healthcare, where the mortality rate increases for patients admitted to hospital on a weekend (named after the former British health secretary Jeremy Hunt)
- The Hunt effect of color science, where colorfulness of a color increases with increasing luminance.
