= Helmholtz–Kohlrausch effect =

Perceptual phenomenon

The Helmholtz–Kohlrausch effect (named after Hermann von Helmholtz and V. A. Kohlrausch) is a perceptual phenomenon wherein the intense saturation of spectral hue is perceived as part of the color's luminance. This brightness increase by saturation, which grows stronger as saturation increases, is chromatic luminance, since achromatic (white) luminance is the standard of comparison. It appears in both self-luminous and surface colors, although it is most pronounced in spectral (monochromatic) colors.

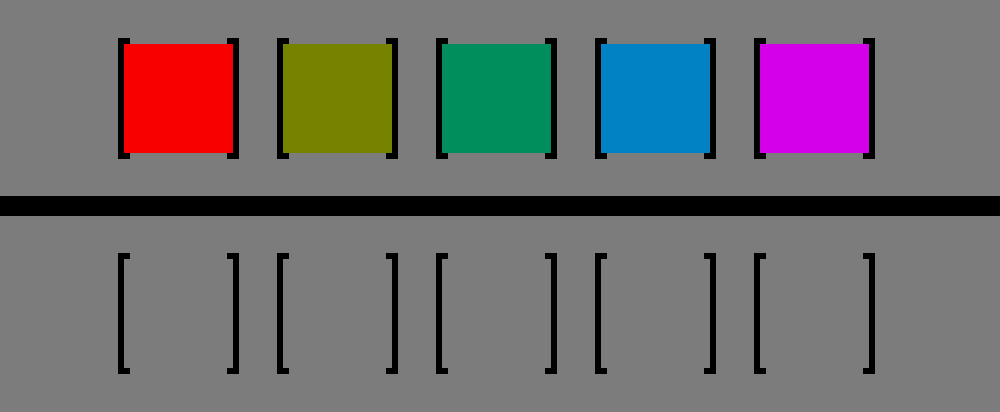
Each color on top has approximately the same lightness level and yet they do not appear equally bright. The yellow sample (second from the left) appears to be much dimmer than the magenta (right-most) one. However, when the top image is converted to grayscale, as seen in the bottom, all the colored squares become the exact same shade of gray.

== Lightness ==
Even when they have the same luminance, colored lights seem brighter to human observers than white light does. Though the mechanical details of brightness perception varies between individuals, when the colors are more saturated, they are generally perceived as brighter than less saturated colors of the same luminance. The mechanical details of brightness perception varies between individuals. For example, observers with red-green colorblindness cannot distinguish the differences between the lightness of the colors, and certain colors do not have significant effect. Two colors that do not have as great of an Helmholtz–Kohlrausch effect as the others are green and yellow. However; any hue of colored lights are perceived as being brighter than white light that has the same luminance.

The Helmholtz–Kohlrausch effect is affected by the viewing environment. This includes the surroundings of the object and the lighting that the object is being viewed under. The Helmholtz–Kohlrausch effect works best in darker environments where there are not any other outside factors influencing the colors. This effect is utilized in theaters, which are commonly kept dark during performances.

== Brightness ==
Brightness is affected most by what is surrounding the object, making the object appear lighter or darker depending on what is around it. In addition, the brightness can also appear different depending on the color of the object. For example, an object that is more saturated will look brighter than an object of the same luminance that is less saturated.

The difference between brightness and lightness is that the brightness is the intensity of the object independent of the light source. Lightness is the brightness of the object in respect to the light reflecting on it. The Helmholtz–Kohlrausch effect is a measure of the ratio between the two.

== Helmholtz color coordinates ==
Similar to the Munsell color system, Helmholtz designed a color coordinate system, where chromaticity is defined by dominant wavelength and purity (saturation).

The percentage of purity for each wavelength can be determined by the equation below:

$$%P = 100 \cdot (S - N)/(DW - N),$$

where %P is the percent of purity, S is the point being assessed, N is the position of the white point, and DW the dominant wavelength.

== Modelling ==
The Helmholtz–Kohlrausch effect has been described in mathematical models by Fairchild and Pirrotta 1991, Nayatani 1997, and more recently by High, Green, and Nussbamm 2023, and Bhaumik and Leloup 2025 (for Virtual Reality environments). Given a color's CIELAB coordinates, these methods produce an adjusted "equivalent achromatic lightness" L*_{EAL}, the shade of that is perceived as being the same brightness as the color.

== Effects on industry ==
=== Entertainment ===
Lighting technicians make use of the Helmholtz–Kohlrausch effect when working in theaters or other venues, since colors of identical brightness may be caused perceptually different brightnesses. On stage, lighting users have the ability to make a white light appear much brighter by adding a color gel. This occurs even though gels can only absorb some of the light. When lighting a stage, the lighting users tend to choose reds, pinks, and blues. Because these colors are highly saturated and strongly induce the Helmholtz–Kohlrausch effect, they can have the same perceived brightness despite some of the light energy being absorbed in the gel. Similarly, saturated narrow-spectrum can create high perceived brightness with lower power outputs than a white light. LED lights are an example of this.

=== Aviation ===
The Helmholtz–Kohlrausch effect influences the use of LED lights in different technological practices. Aviation is one field that relies upon the results of the Helmholtz–Kohlrausch effect. A comparison of runway LED lamps and filtered and unfiltered incandescent lights all at the same luminance shows that in order to accomplish the same brightness, the white reference incandescent lamp needs to have twice the luminance of the red LED lamp, therefore suggesting that the LED lights do appear to have a greater brightness than the traditional incandescent lights. One condition that affects this theory is the presence of fog.

=== Automotive ===
Another field affected by this phenomenon is the automotive industry. LEDs in the dashboard and instrument lighting are designed for use in mesopic luminance. In studies, it has been found that red LEDs appear brighter than green LEDs under these conditions, which means that a driver would be able to see red light more intensely and would thus be more alerting than green lights when driving at night.

== See also ==
- Color appearance model
- Bezold–Brücke shift
