= Abney effect =

Perceived hue shift when white light is added to a monochromatic light source

An illustration of the Abney effect. As white is added to red, it shifts slightly towards magenta; green shifts towards cyan, and blue shifts towards violet. The RGB primaries on a typical display are not monochromatic, making the effect weaker than in the usual experimental setup.

The Abney effect or the purity-on-hue effect is the perceived hue shift that occurs when white light is added to a monochromatic light source.

The addition of white light will cause a desaturation of the monochromatic source, as perceived by the human observer. However, a less intuitive effect of the perceived white light addition is the change in the apparent hue. This hue shift is physiological rather than physical in nature.

This variance of hue as a result of the addition of white light was first described by the English chemist and physicist Sir William de Wiveleslie Abney in 1909, although the date is commonly reported as 1910. A white light source can be created by the combination of red, blue, and green light. Abney demonstrated that the cause of the apparent change in hue was the red and green light that comprised this light source, and that the blue light component had no contribution to the Abney effect.

== Chromaticity diagrams ==
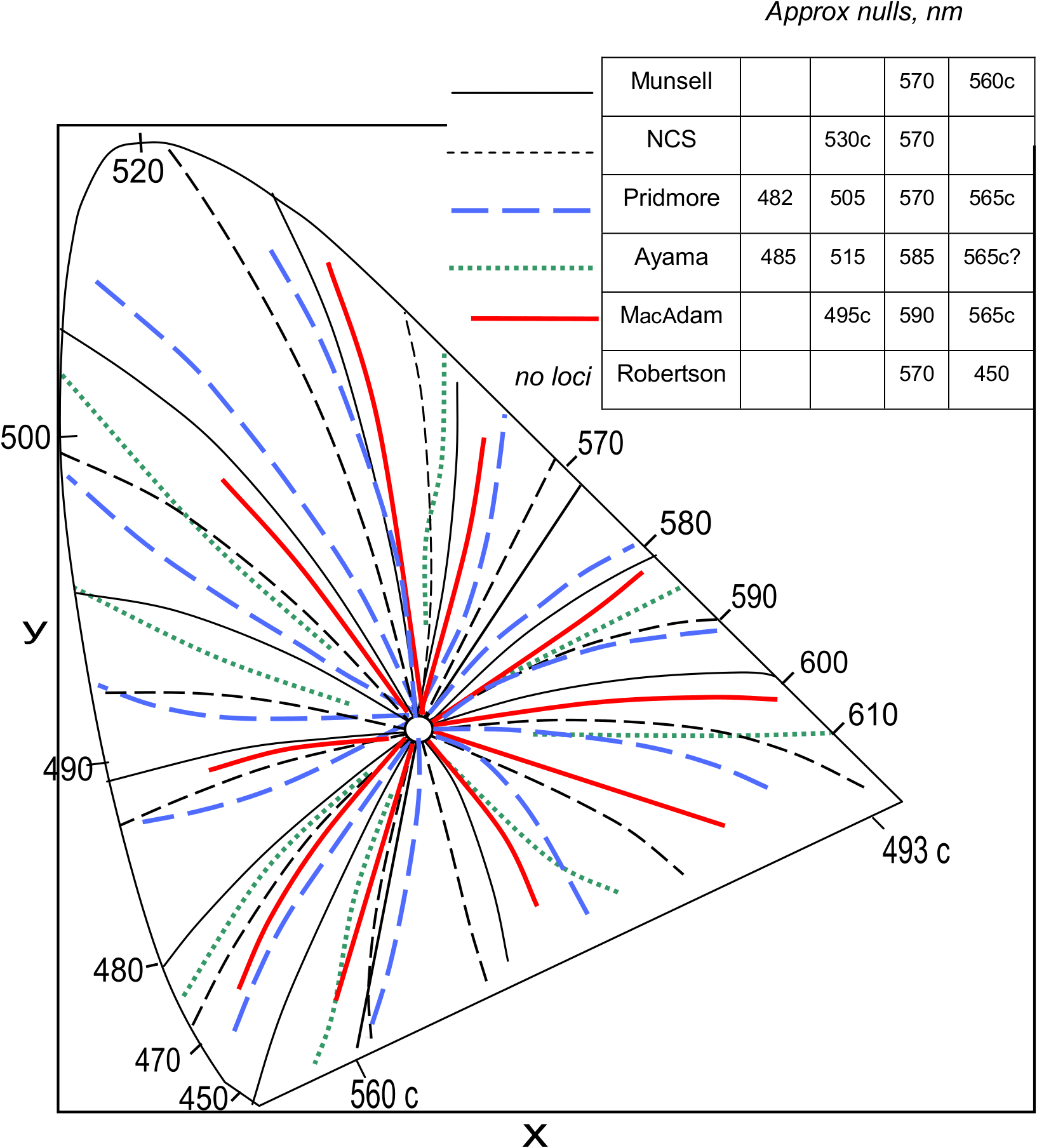
Purity-on-hue (Abney) effect in CIE 1931 chromaticity diagram, showing five experimental datasets. Inset table shows approximate nulls, i.e. wavelengths where the effect doesn't seem to appear. Confusingly, the data don't seem to agree except for nulls in violet and yellow ranges.

Chromaticity diagrams are two-dimensional diagrams that plot the projection of the International Commission on Illumination (CIE) XYZ color space onto the (x, y) plane. The X, Y, Z values (or tristimulus values) are simply used as weightings to create new colors from the primary colors, much in the same way that RGB is used for creating colors from primaries in televisions or photographs. The x and y values used to create the chromaticity diagram are created from the XYZ values by dividing X and Y by the sum of X, Y, Z. The chromaticity values that can then be plotted are dependent upon two values: dominant wavelength and saturation. Since luminous energy is not included, colors that differ only in its lightness are not distinguished on the diagram. For instance, brown, which is just low-luminance (and often desaturated) orange, will not appear as such.

The Abney effect can be illustrated on chromaticity diagrams as well. If one adds white light to a monochromatic light, one will obtain a straight line on the chromaticity diagram. We might imagine that the colors along such a line are all perceived as having the same hue. In reality, this does not hold true, and a hue shift is perceived. Correspondingly, if we plot colors that are perceived as having the same hue (and only differing in purity) we will obtain a curved line.

In chromaticity diagrams, a line that has constant perceived hue must generally be curved, so that the Abney effect is accounted for. Also, the Abney effect does not disallow any and all straight lines on chromaticity diagrams. One may mix two monochromatic lights and not see a shift in hue, thereby suggesting a straight-line plot for the different levels of mixture would be appropriate on a chromaticity diagram.

== Physiology ==
The opponent process model of the visual system is composed of two chromatic neural channels and one achromatic neural channel. The chromatic channels consist of a red-green channel and a yellow-blue channel and transmit color information. The achromatic channel is responsible for luminance, or white-black discrimination. Hue and saturation are perceived due to varying amounts of activity in these neural channels consisting of axon pathways from retinal ganglion cells. These three channels are tied closely to reaction time in response to colors. The achromatic neural channel has a faster response time than the chromatic neural channels under most conditions. The functions of these channels are task-dependent. Some activities are dependent on one channel or the other, while others depend on both channels. When a colored stimulus is summed with a white stimulus, both the chromatic and achromatic channels are activated. The achromatic channel will have a slightly slowed response time, since it must adjust to the different luminance; however, despite this delayed response, the speed of the achromatic channel will still be faster than that of the chromatic channel. In these conditions of summed stimuli, the magnitude of the signal emitted by the achromatic channel will be stronger than that of the chromatic channel. The coupling of a faster response with a higher amplitude from the achromatic channel means that reaction time will most likely depend on both the luminance and the saturation levels of the stimuli.

The customary explanations for color vision explain the difference in hue perception as elemental sensations that are inherent to the physiology of the observer. However, no specific physiological constraints or theories have been able to explain the response to each unique hue. To this end, both the observer's spectral sensitivity and the relative number of cone types have proven to not play any significant role in perceiving different hues. Perhaps the environment plays a larger role in the perception of unique hues than the different physiological features across individuals. This is supported by the fact that color judgments can vary depending on differences in the color environment across long periods of time, but these same chromatic and achromatic judgments are held constant if the color environment is the same, despite aging and other individual physiological factors affecting the retina.

Like the Bezold–Brücke effect, the Abney effect suggests a non-linearity between the cone responses (LMS) to the stage of hue perception.

== Colorimetric purity ==
The saturation, or degree of paleness of a color, is related to colorimetric purity. The equation for colorimetric purity is: P = L/(L_{w} + L). In this equation, L equals the luminance of the colored light stimulus, L_{w} is the luminance of the white light stimulus to be mixed with the colored light. The above equation is a way of quantifying the amount of white light that is mixed with the colored light. In the case of pure spectral color, with no white light added, L equals one and L_{w} equals zero. This means colorimetric purity would equal one, and for any case involving the addition of white light, the colorimetric purity, or the value of P, would be less than one. The purity of a spectral color stimulus can be altered by adding white, black, or gray stimulus. However, the Abney effect describes the change in colorimetric purity by the addition of white light. In order to determine the effect that changing the purity has on the perceived hue, it is important that purity be the only variable in the experiment; luminance must be kept constant.

== Hue discrimination ==
The term hue discrimination is used to describe the change in wavelength that must be obtained in order for the eye to detect a shift in hue. An expression λ + Δλ defines the required wavelength adjustment that must take place. A small (< 2 nm) change in wavelength causes most spectral colors to appear to take on a different hue. However, for blue light and red light, a much larger wavelength shift must occur in order for a person to be able to identify a difference in hue.

== History ==
The original article describing the Abney effect was published by Sir William de Wiveleslie Abney in Proceedings of the Royal Society of London, Series A in December 1909. He decided to do quantitative research following the discovery that the visual observations of color did not match the dominant colors obtained photographically when using models of fluorescence.

A color-measuring apparatus commonly used in experiments in the 1900s was used in conjunction with partially silvered mirrors to split one beam of light into two beams. This resulted in two beams of light parallel to one another having the same intensity and color. The beams of light were projected onto a white background, creating patches of light that were 1.25-inch (32 mm) squares. The white light was added to one of the patches of colored light, the patch on the right. A rod was inserted in the path of the two beams so that there would be no space in between the colored surfaces. An additional rod was used to create a shadow where the white light scattered onto the patch that was not to receive addition of white light (the patch on the left side). The amount of white light added was determined as one half of the luminosity of the colored light. The red light source, for example, had more white light added than the yellow light source. He began using two patches of red light, and in fact, the addition of white light to the light patch on the right caused a more yellow tone than the pure red light source. The same results happened when the experimental light source was orange. When the light source was green, the addition of white light caused the appearance of the patch to become yellow-green. Subsequently, when white light was added to yellow-green light, the patch of light appeared primarily yellow. In a mixture of blue-green light (with a slightly higher percentage of blue) with white light, the blue appeared to take on a reddish hue. In the case of a violet light source, the addition of white light caused the violet light to take on a blue tint.

Abney hypothesized that the resulting change in hue that occurred was due to the red light and green light that were components of the white light being added. He also thought that the blue light that also comprises the white light beam was a negligible factor that had no effect on the apparent hue shift. Abney was able to prove his hypothesis experimentally by matching his experimental values of percentage composition and luminosities of red, green, and blue sensations to the calculated values almost exactly. He examined the percentage composition and luminosity found in the different spectral colors as well as the white light source that was added.

== Similar effect of bandwidth ==
While the nonlinearity of neural color-coding, as evidenced by the classical understanding of the Abney effect and its use of white light to particular wavelengths of light, has been thoroughly studied in the past, a new method was undertaken by researchers at the University of Nevada. Rather than adding white light to monochromatic light, the bandwidth of the spectrum was varied. This variation of bandwidth directly targeted the three classes of cone receptors as a means of identifying any hue shifts as perceived by the human eye. The overall goal of the research was to determine whether the appearance of color was affected by the filtering effects of the spectral sensitivity of the eye. Experiments showed that the cone ratios signaling a hue were adjusted so as to produce a constant hue that matched the central wavelength of the light source. Also, the experiments conducted essentially showed that the Abney effect does not hold for all changes in light purity, but is limited very much to certain means of purity degradation, namely the addition of white light. Since the experiments undertaken varied the bandwidth of the light, a similar albeit different means of altering the purity and therefore hue of the monochromatic light, the nonlinearity of the results displayed differently from what had traditionally been seen. Ultimately, the researchers came to the conclusion that variations in spectral bandwidth cause postreceptoral mechanisms to compensate for the filtering effects imposed by cone sensitivities and preretinal absorption and that the Abney effect occurs because the eye has, in a sense, been tricked into seeing a color that would not naturally occur and must therefore approximate the color. This approximation to compensate for the Abney effect is a direct function of the cone excitations experienced with a broadband spectrum.

== Miscellaneous facts ==
A patent for a color printer that claims to compensate for the Abney effect was published in 1995.

The Abney effect must be taken into account when designing the cockpit for modern fighter planes. The colors viewed on the screen become desaturated when white light strikes the screen, so special considerations are made to counteract the Abney effect.

A wide array of spectral colors exist that can be made to exactly match a pure color by adding various levels of white light.

== See also ==
- Color appearance model
- White point
- Bezold–Brücke shift
