= Sang de boeuf glaze =

Deep red ceramic glaze

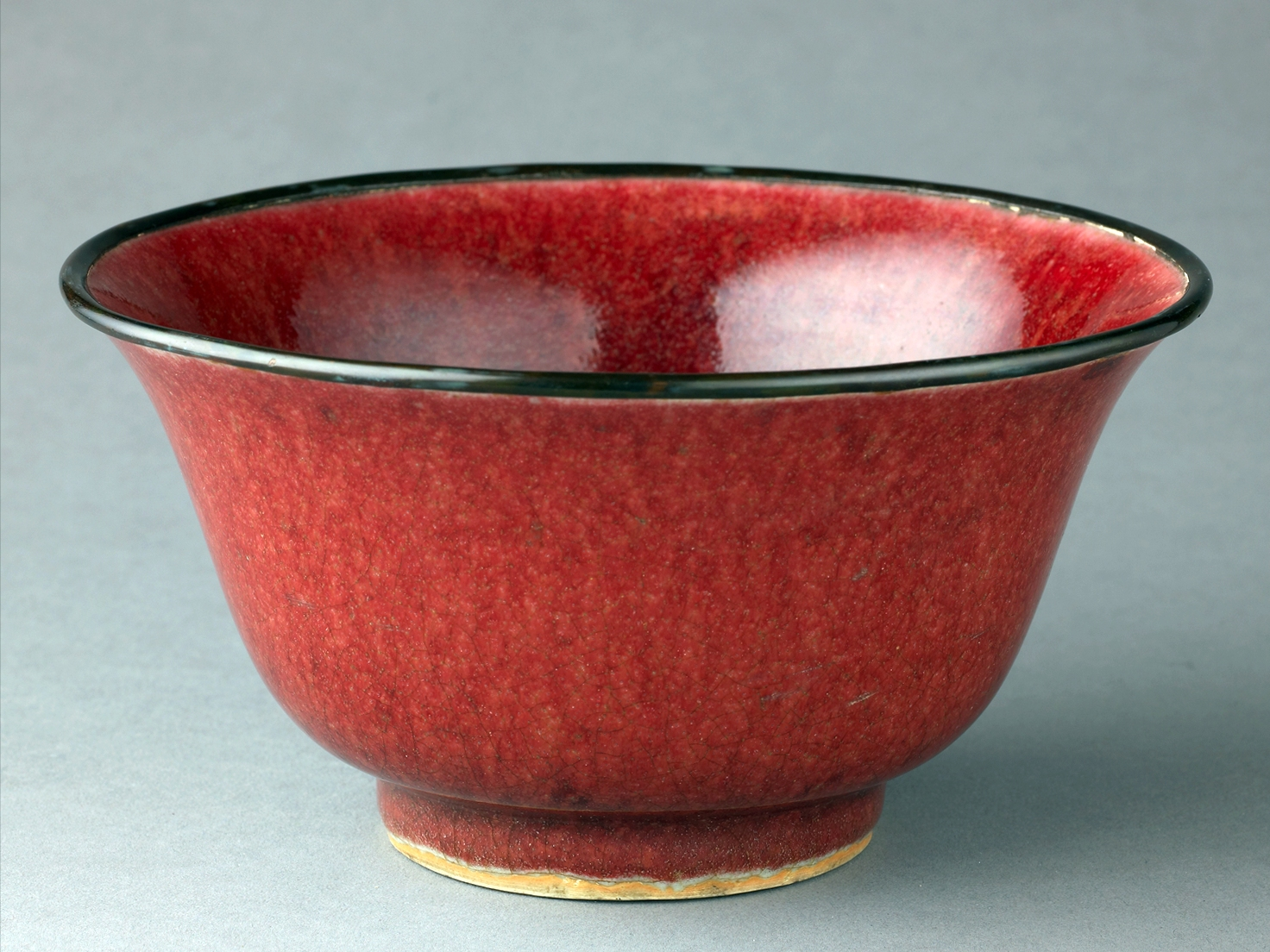
18th-century Chinese porcelain bowl with sang de boeuf glaze

Sang de boeuf glaze, or sang-de-boeuf, is a deep red colour of ceramic glaze, first appearing in Chinese porcelain at the start of the 18th century. The name is French, meaning "ox blood" (or cow blood), and the glaze and the colour sang de boeuf are also called ox-blood or oxblood in English, in this and other contexts.

Sang de boeuf was one of a number of new "flambé" glazes, marked by "unpredictable but highly decorative and varying effects", developed in the Jingdezhen porcelain kilns during the Kangxi reign (1662–1722). According to one scholar: "In its finer examples, this spectacular glaze gives the impression that one is gazing through a limpid surface layer, which is slightly crazed and strewn with countless bubbles, to the color that lies underneath".

As with most Chinese red glazes, the main colouring agent is copper oxide, fired in a reducing atmosphere (without oxygen); finishing them in an oxidizing atmosphere may have been part of the process. From the late 19th century onwards, usually after lengthy experiment, many Western potters produced versions of the Chinese glaze, which is technically very difficult to achieve and control.

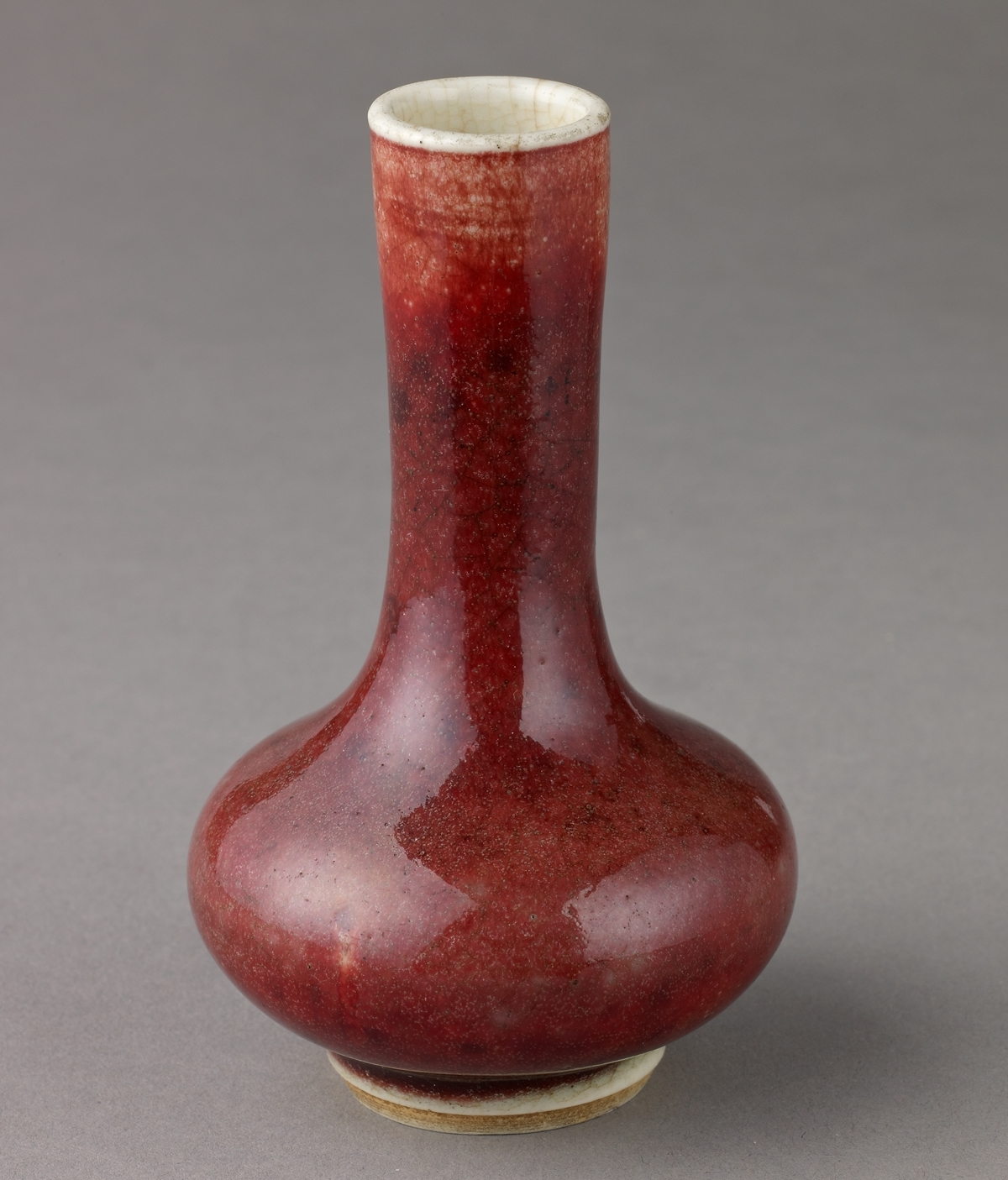
Small 18th-century vase, with thinning glaze at top

For Chinese ceramics, some museums and books prefer the term "sang de boeuf", some "oxblood", in both cases with varying use of hyphens, and capitals and italics for "sang de boeuf". The most common Chinese name for the glaze is lángyáohóng (郎窑红, "Lang kiln red"). Another Chinese name for this type of glaze is niúxiěhóng (牛血红, "ox-blood red/sang de boeuf").

== Chinese sang de boeuf ==
=== Origin as imitation of Ming wares ===
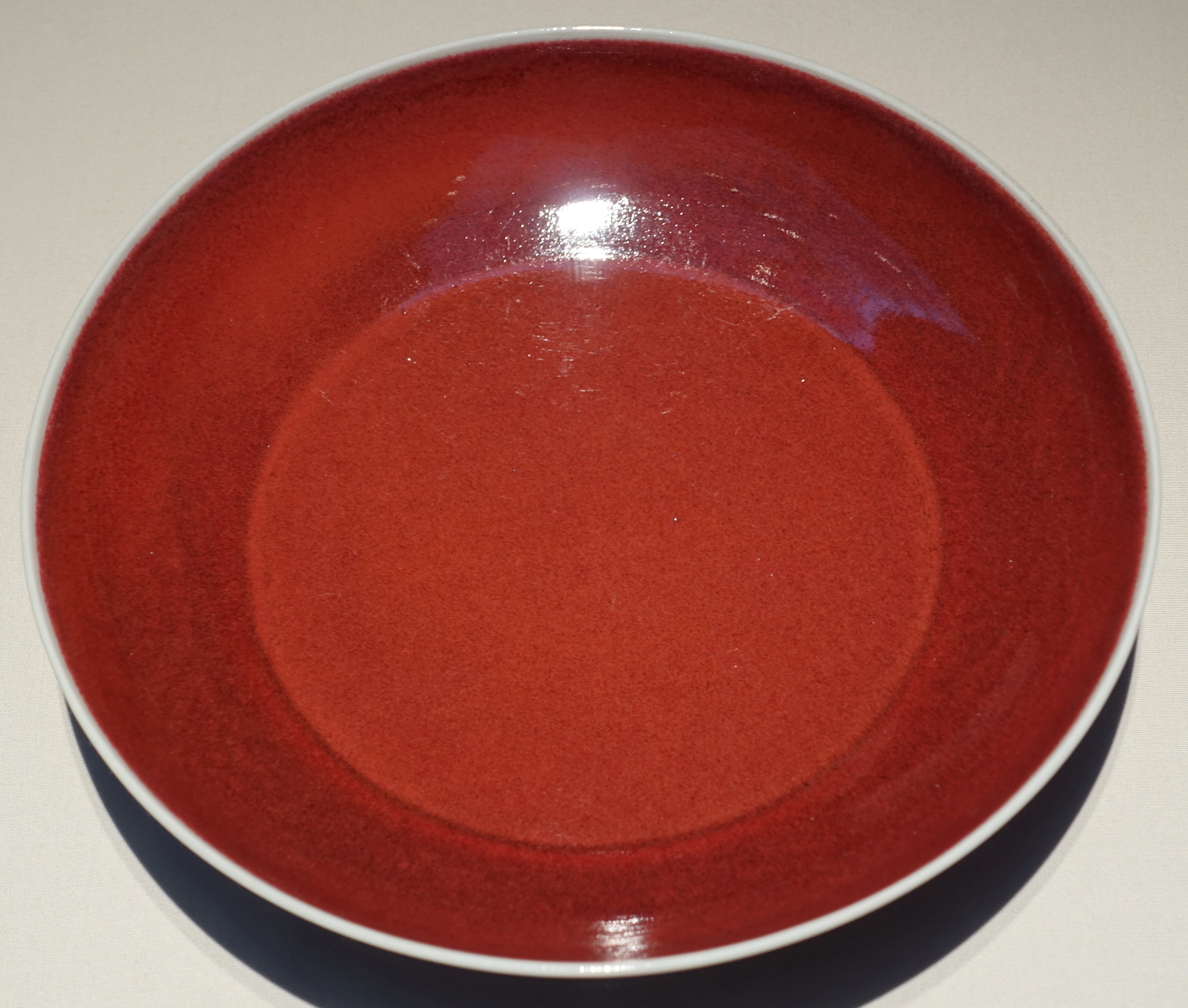
Ming "sacrificial ware" copper-red dish with the reign mark of Xuande (1426–1435); the colour the Kangxi potters were trying to achieve

Sang de boeuf glaze was apparently developed around 1705–1712 in an attempt to recover the lost "sacrificial red" glaze of the Xuande reign (1426–35) of the Ming dynasty. This was a very famous glaze used for ceremonial (ritual) wares made at Jingdezhen, of which very few examples survive from his short reign.

As recorded in the Collected Statutes of the Ming Dynasty, from 1369, the second year of Hongwu Emperor's reign at the beginning of the Ming dynasty, monochrome porcelains replaced other materials for the ritual vessels used in the official rituals of sacrifices the emperor was required by tradition to perform, hence the name "sacrificial red". Chinese names for it are xiānhóng (鲜红, "fresh red") and bǎoshíhóng (宝石红, "ruby red"). The statute also states that each colour was associated with a specific direction and ritual: "To each direction is associated a porcelain: red for the altar of the Sun, blue for that of Heaven, yellow for the Earth and white for the Moon".

The sacrificial red developed under Xuande ceased to be produced after the emperor's death, and has never been perfectly imitated, despite many later attempts. This suggests the close personal interest some emperors took in the imperial potteries, and also that some secrets must have been restricted to a small group of potters.

=== Qing sang de boeuf ===
Monochrome glazes like sang de boeuf enjoyed a revival in the Qing dynasty, for whom they evoked what were regarded as the high points of historical Chinese ceramics under the early Ming and the Song dynasty (960–1279). They were produced for the imperial court at Jingdezhen alongside completely different styles painted with elaborate designs using newly expanded palette of colours in overglaze enamels, known as famille rose, famille verte and so on, based on the dominant colour. Initially, much of this production was for sale, often as Chinese export porcelain, where the court preferred simpler decoration.

Where the Xuande sacrificial red pieces have a very subtle mottled coverage, sang de boeuf was produced with a variety of shades of colour and as well as mottling, streaked effects in the glaze, which often fades to white at the top of pieces, and conversely thickens around the shoulders of vases and at the foot, which is often not fully covered by the glaze. There is often crackle, and a greenish tinge at the edges of the glazed area, where the glaze is thin. All of these were considered desirable effects. Generally the glaze is only applied to the outside of closed shapes, the inside and rim left with a clear glaze. The red glaze was probably applied by spraying. Other colours that may appear are turquoise, lavender, and purple.

The great number of very sensitive variables meant that the glaze colour and effects were initially not reliably controlled by the makers, leaving an element of randomness that appealed to Chinese aesthetics. By the late 18th century more control was possible.

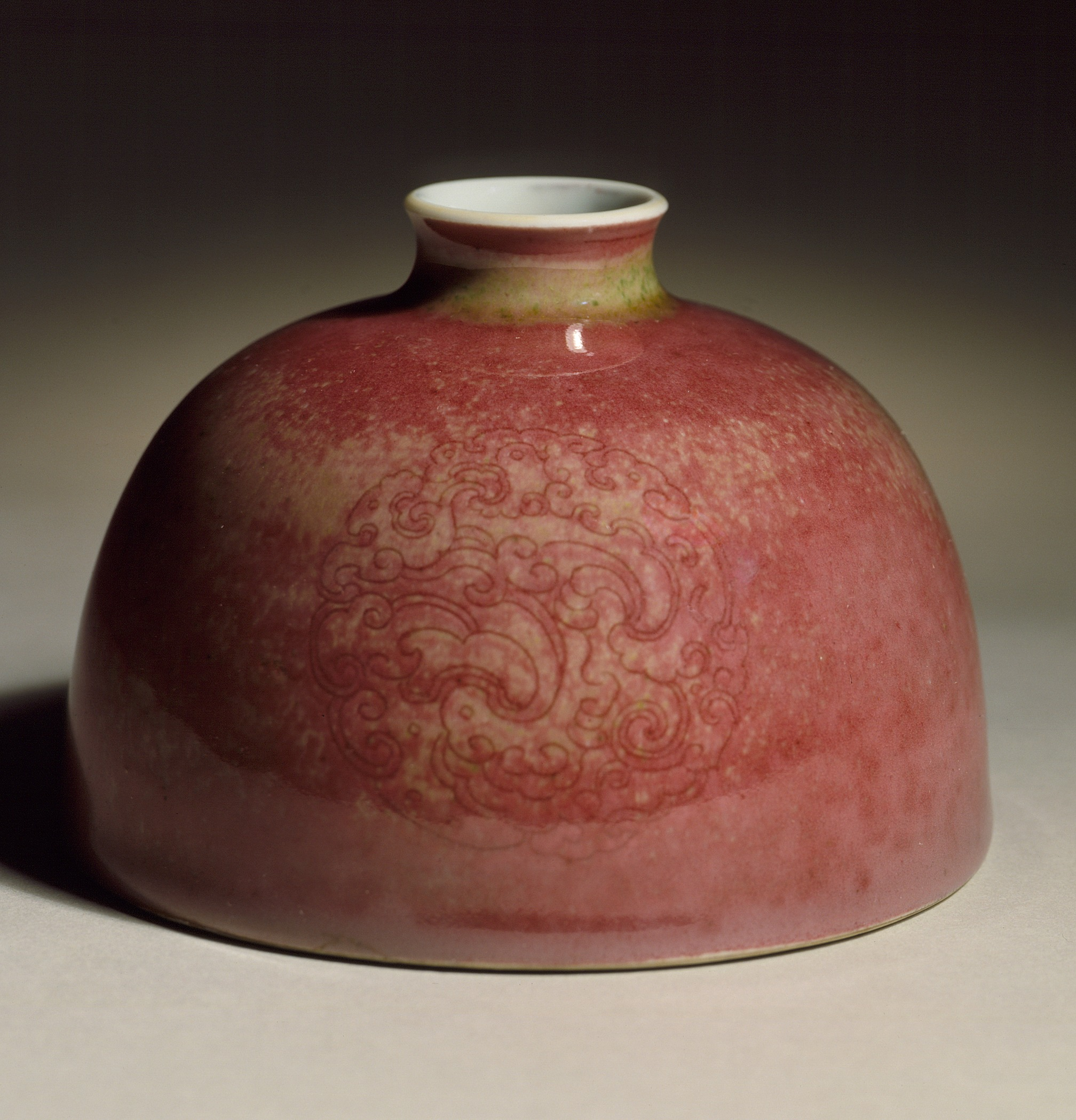
The related copper oxide peach-bloom glaze on a Kangxi water pot, also with incised decoration.

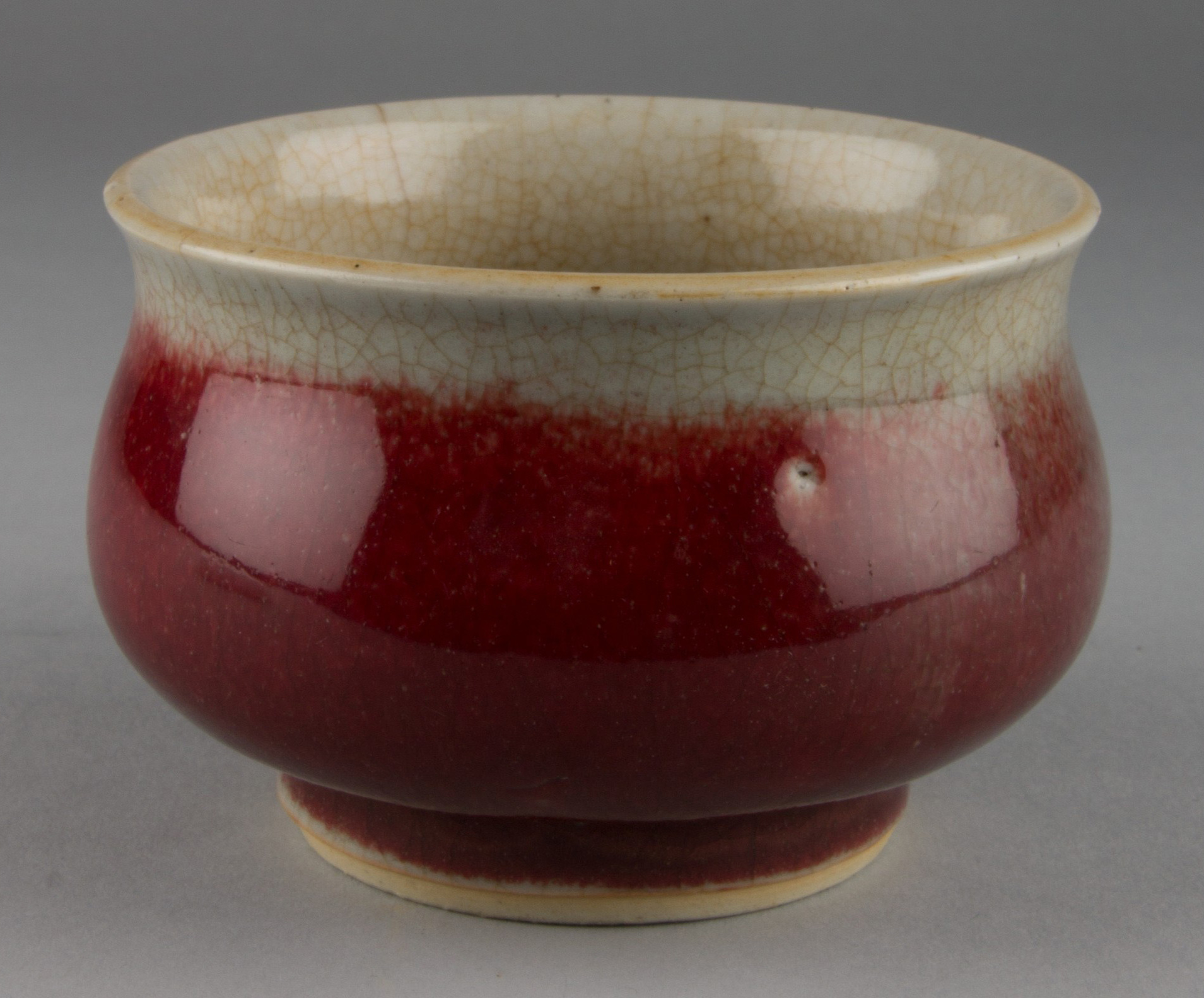
Kangxi bowl, before 1722

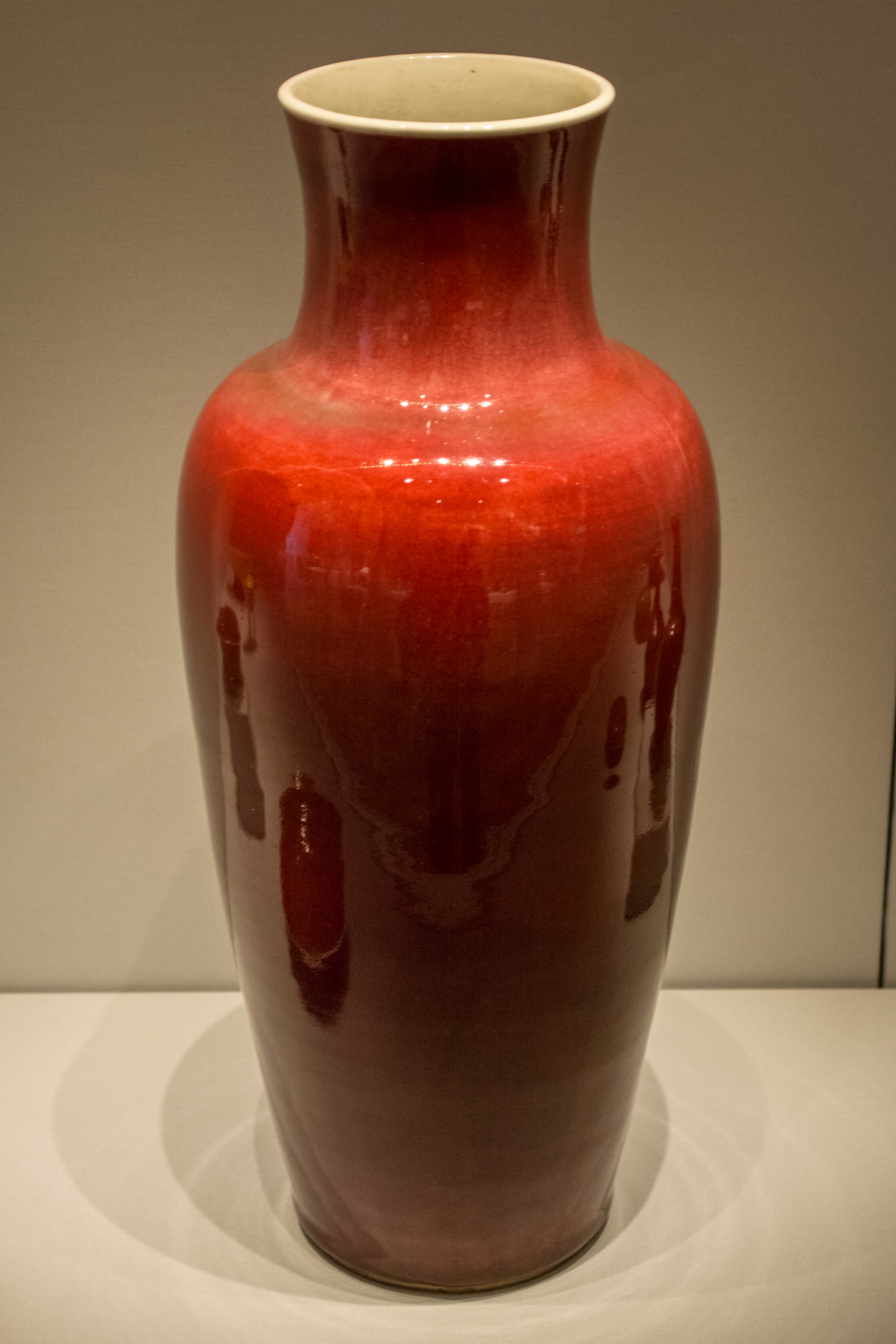
Kangxi vase, before 1722

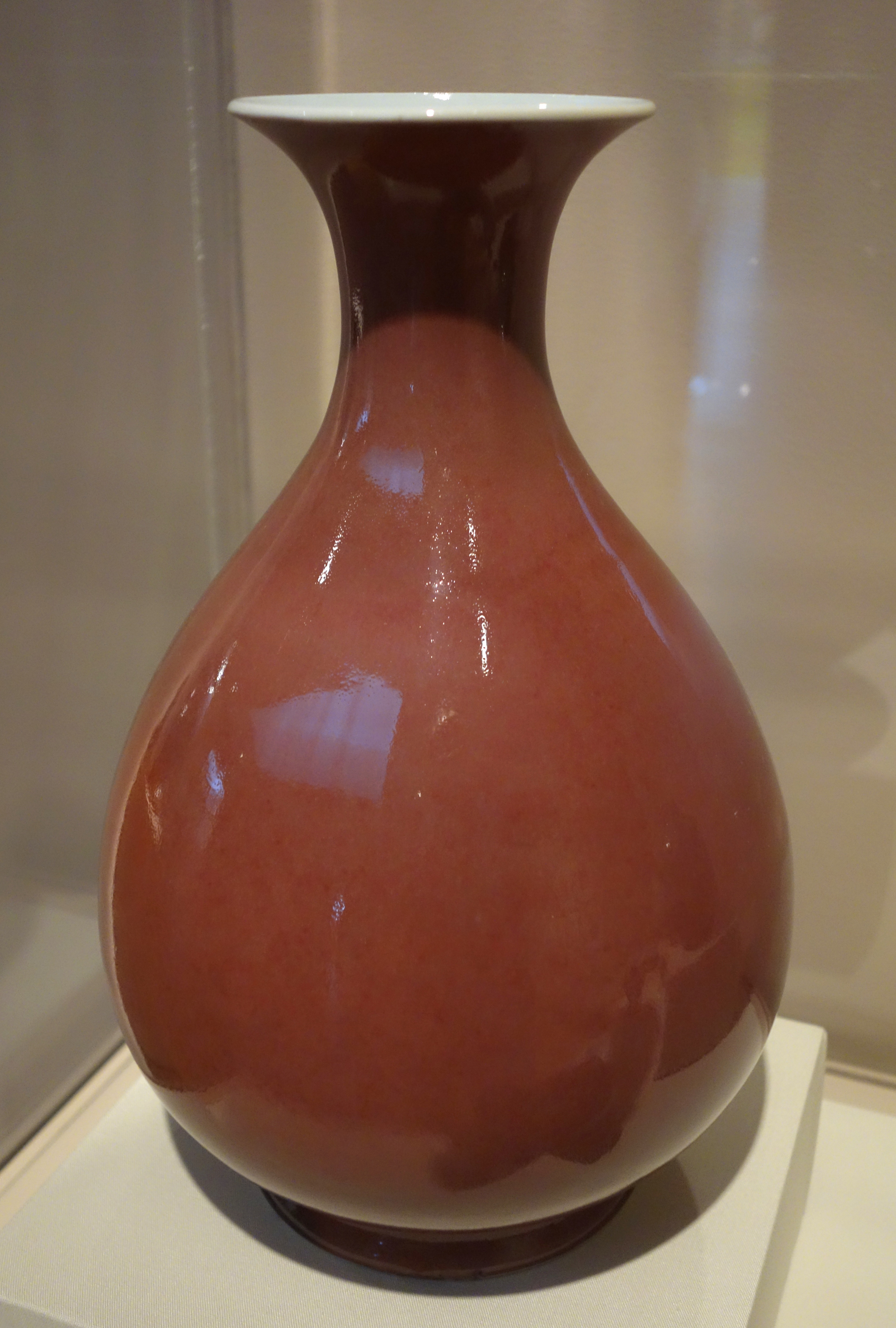
Kangxi vase, before 1722

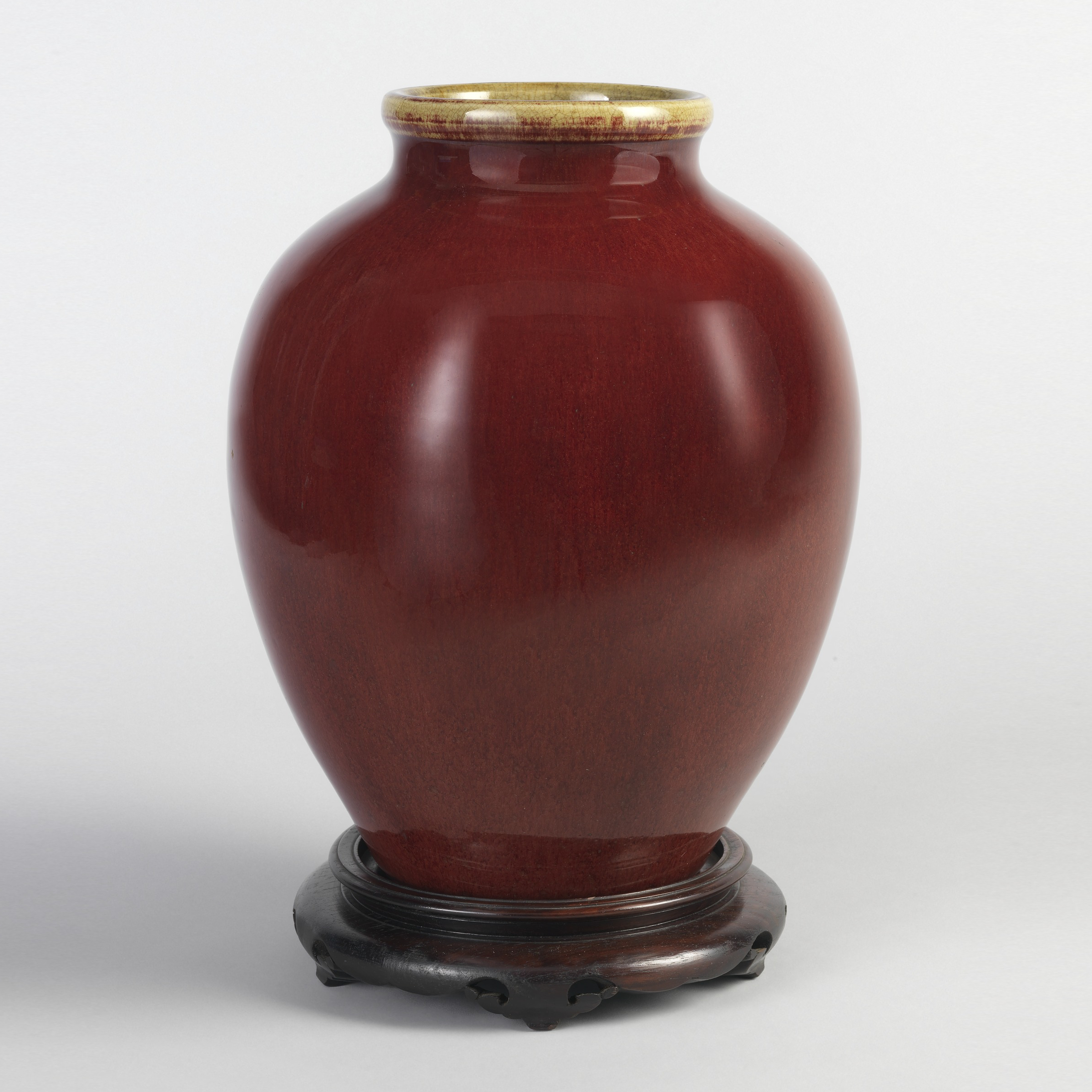
18th-century jar

== Western versions ==
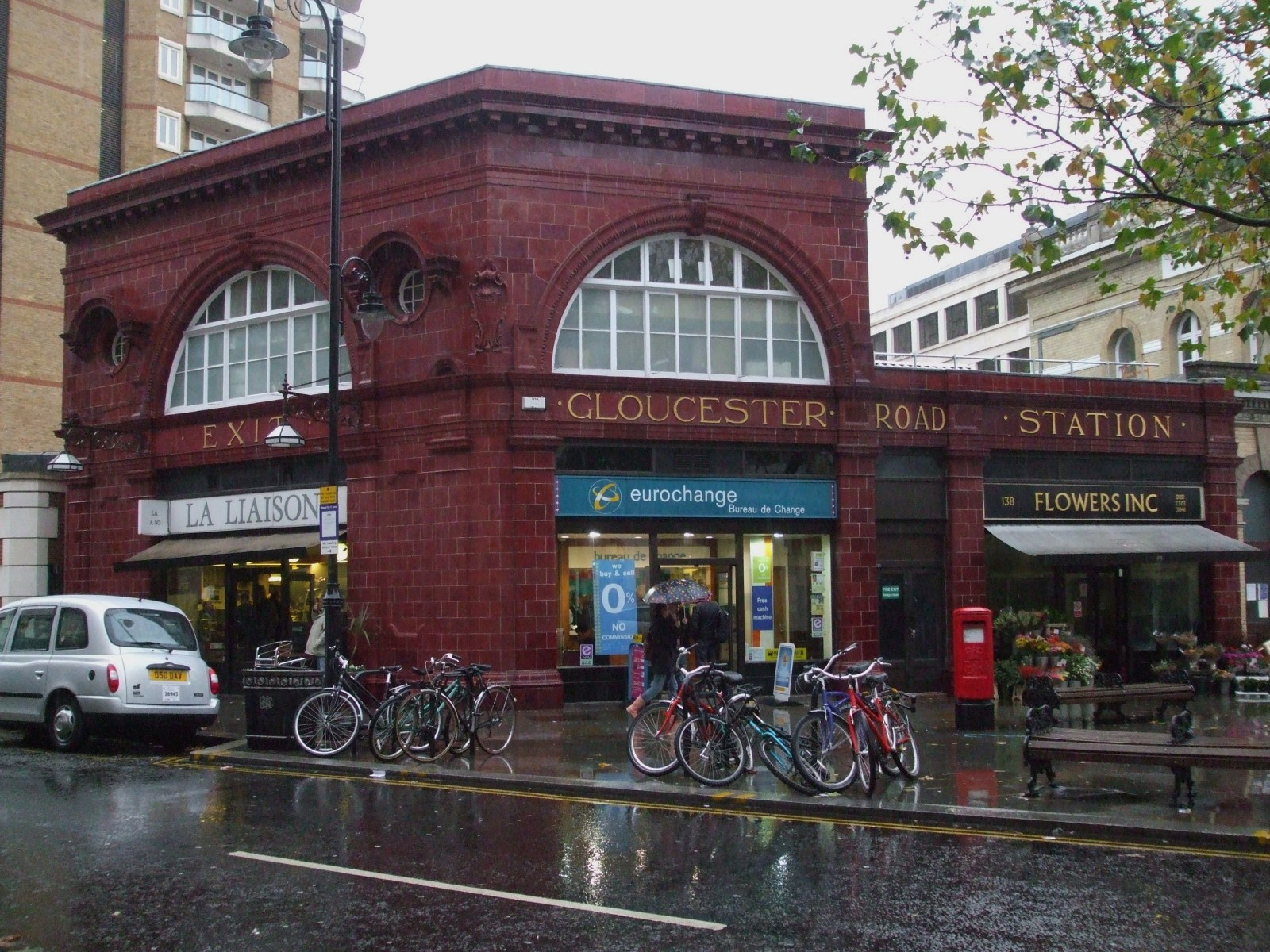
Gloucester Road station, Piccadilly line, with the sang de boeuf tiles used on many London Underground station buildings

In the 19th century various Western potters, especially in the emerging art pottery movement, tried to copy the Chinese glaze, which had acquired a great reputation, but found replicating it very difficult, whether in porcelain or stoneware. In France Sèvres porcelain began experimenting in 1882. Ernest Chaplet succeeded in making it in 1885, with financial backing from Haviland & Co., and Pierre-Adrien Dalpayrat also succeeded in making a version. Chaplet won a gold medal at the 1889 Exposition Universelle in Paris for his glaze.

The American Hugh C. Robertson, of the Chelsea Keramic Art Works in Chelsea, Massachusetts, became interested in Oriental glazes on seeing them at the Philadelphia Exposition of 1876 and a "preoccupation with glazes was to obsess Robertson for the rest of his career". He finally developed a version of sang de boeuf in 1888, which he nicknamed Sang de Chelsea, but the following year, "nearly penniless from his costly experiments with the sang-de-boeuf glaze", he closed the pottery.

In England the Ruskin Pottery in Smethwick achieved a glaze around 1900; all their formulas were deliberately destroyed when the pottery closed in 1935. Another English art pottery which produced sang de boeuf was that of Bernard Moore. His pottery in Stoke-on-Trent specialised in flambé glazes from 1905 till the closure of the business in 1915.

From 1903, the English architect Leslie Green used an industrial, solid, sang de boeuf glaze on the glazed architectural terra-cotta tiles and decorative elements for the exteriors of the stations of a large part of the London Underground system, which was then divided between a number of commercial companies. His employer, the Underground Electric Railways Company of London was building the Great Northern, Piccadilly and Brompton Railway, the Baker Street and Waterloo Railway and the Charing Cross, Euston and Hampstead Railway, which are now respectively sections of the Piccadilly line, Bakerloo line and Northern line. The Leeds Fireclay Company made the tiles.

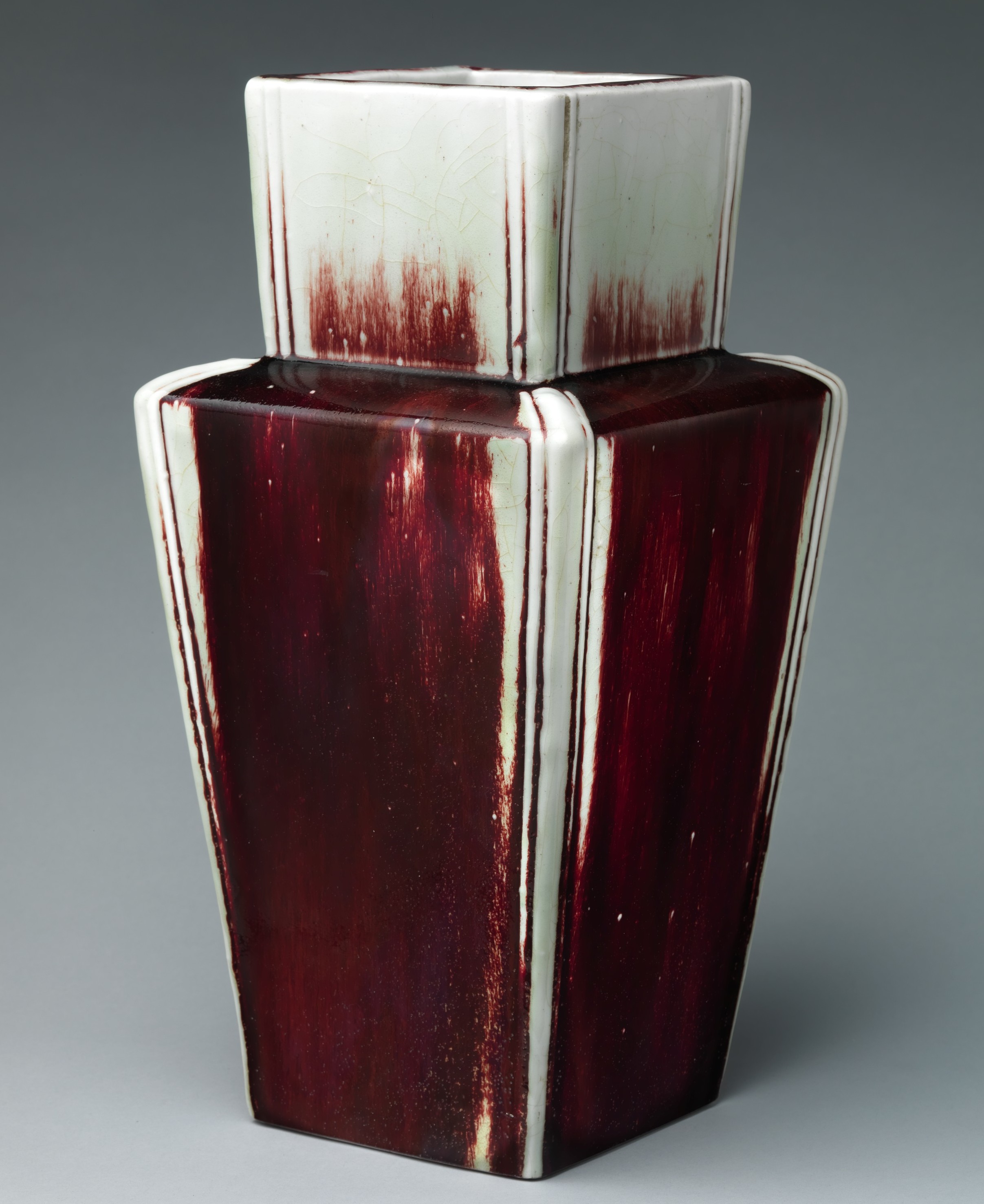
Square vase by Ernest Chaplet, French, c. 1889; the Chinese thinning is taken to an extreme.

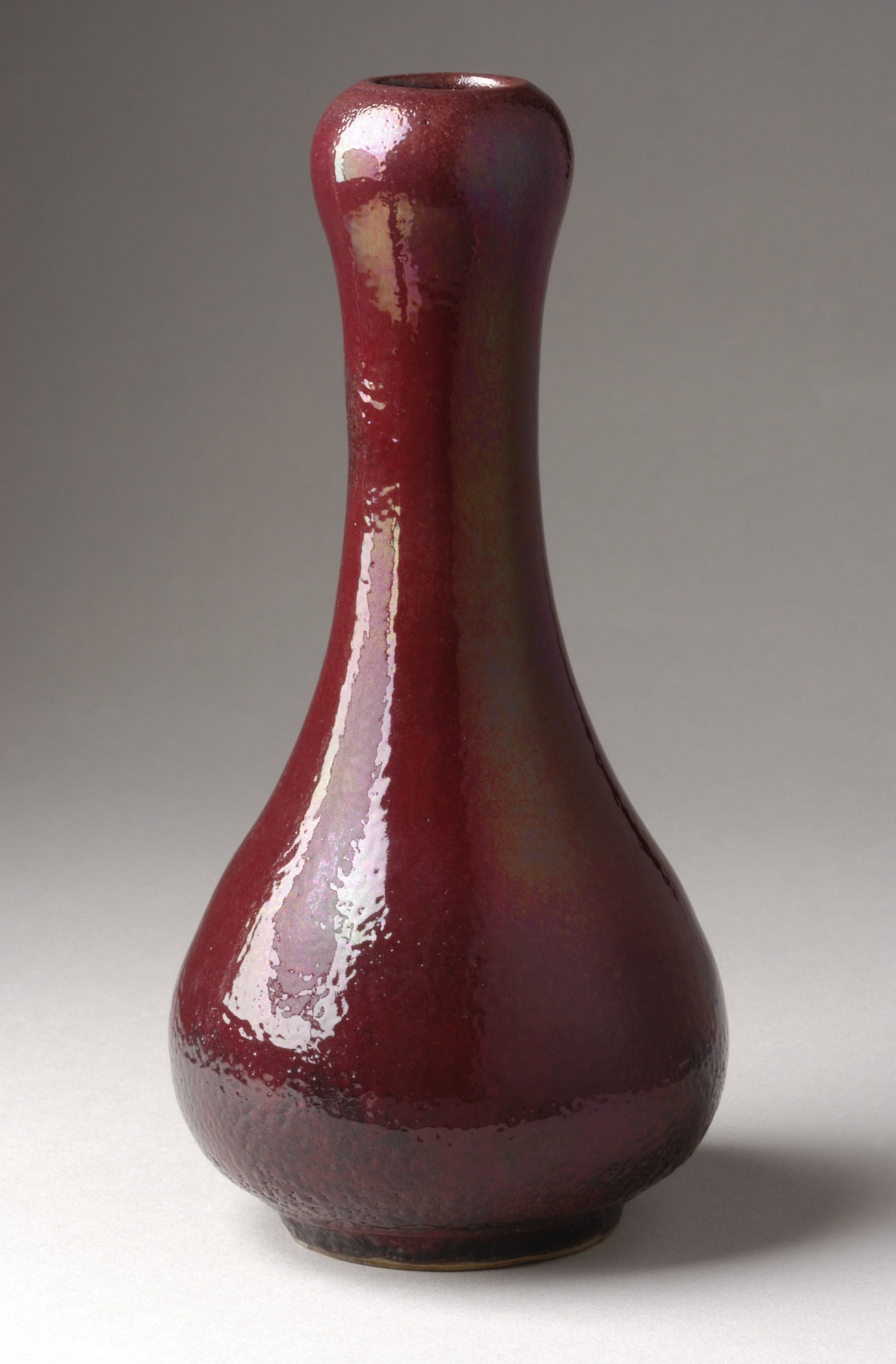
Vase by Hugh C. Robertson, Chelsea Keramic Art Works, 1888–89

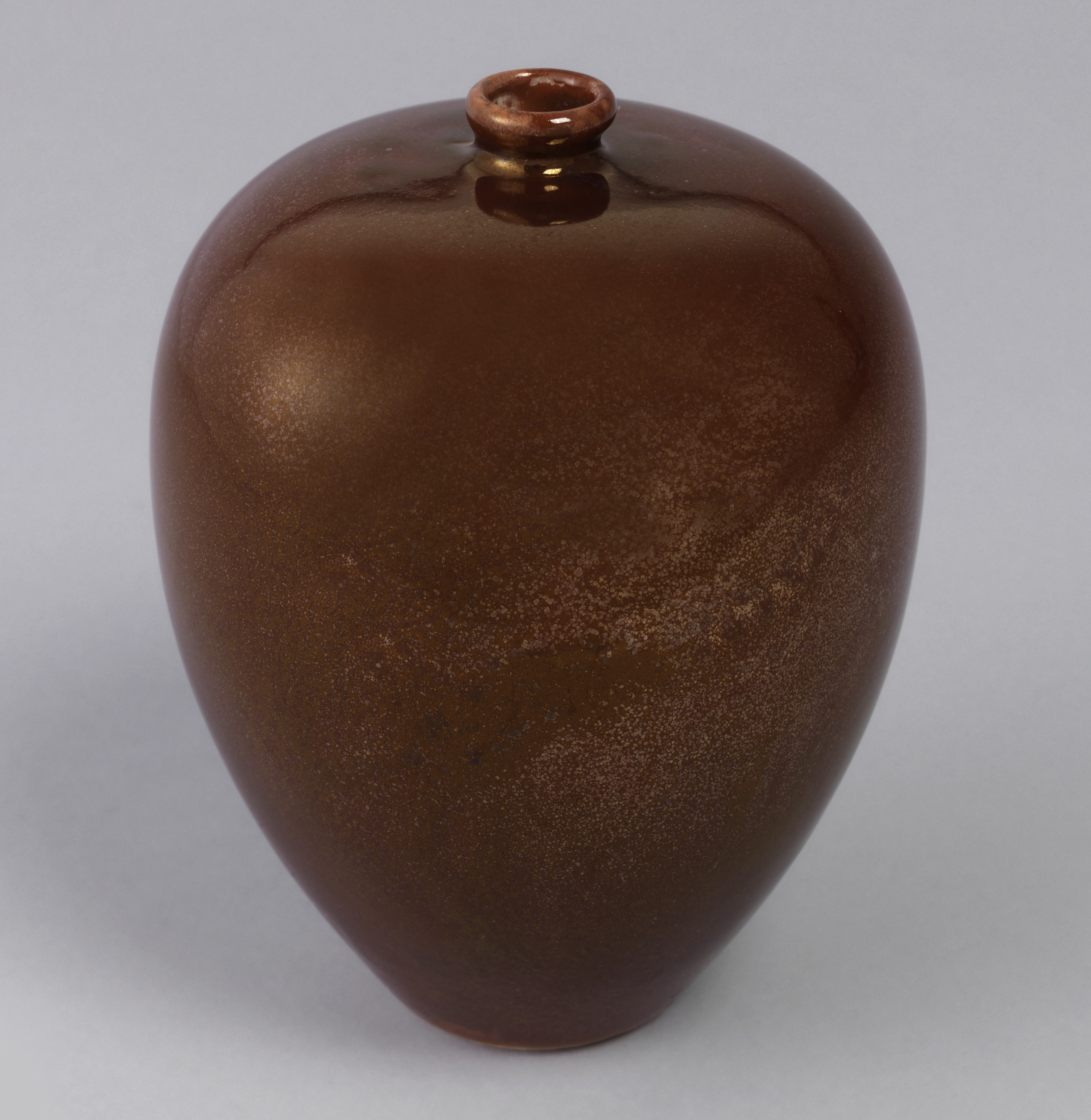
Rookwood Pottery Company, US, 1899

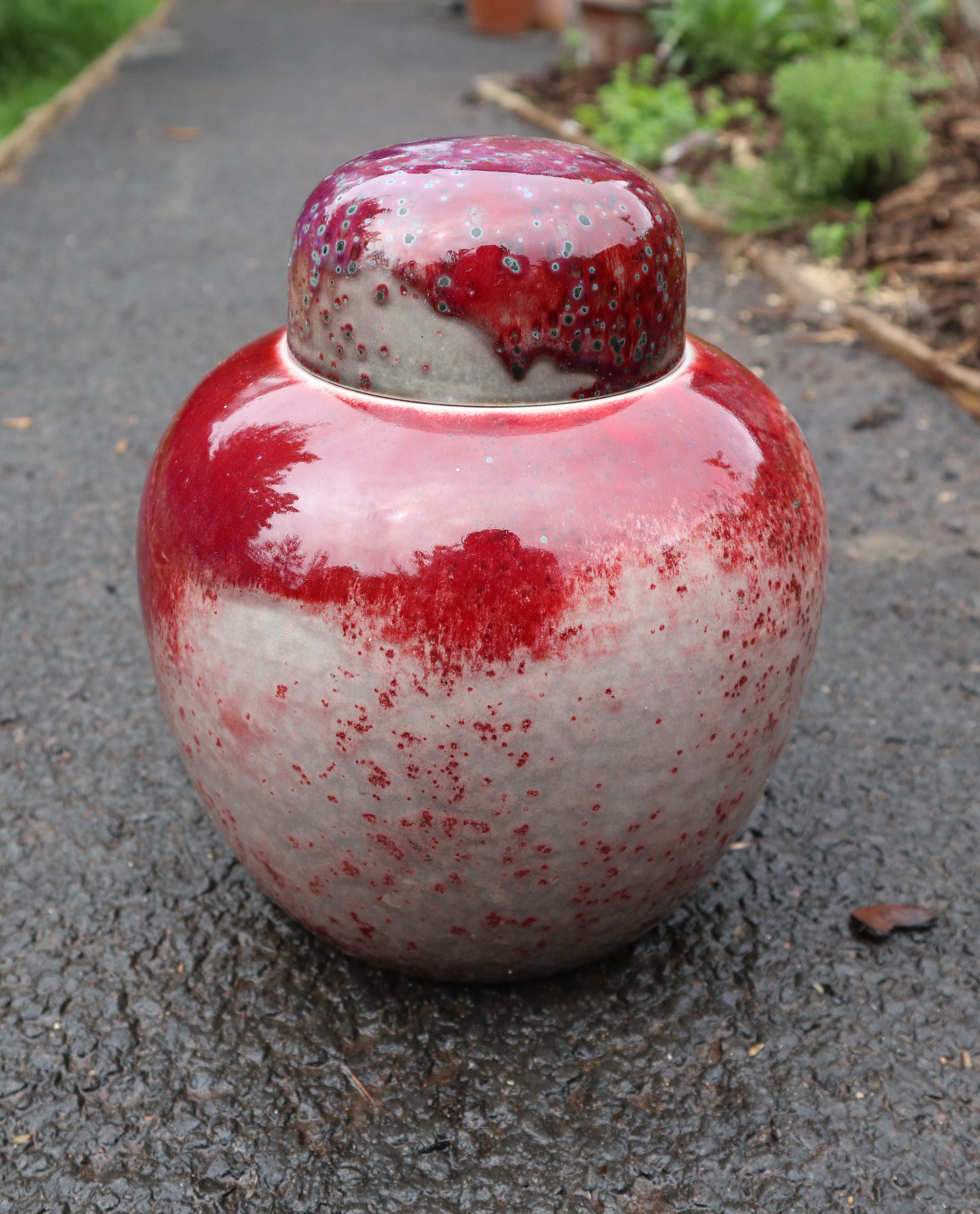
Ruskin Pottery, English, 1925

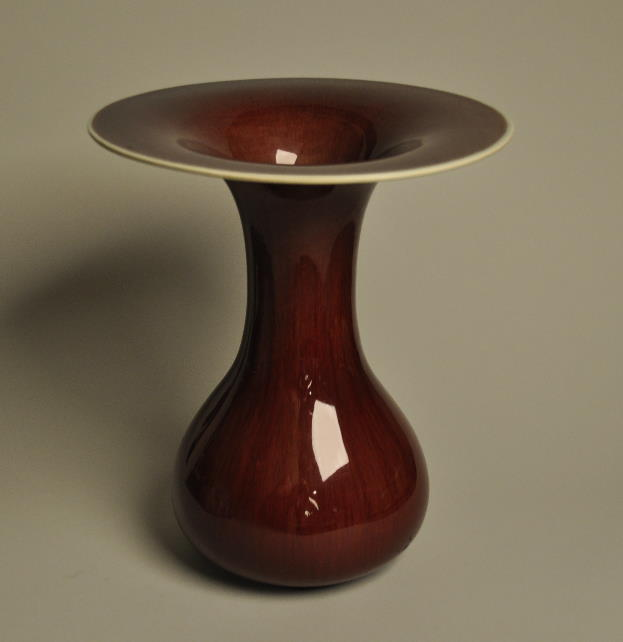
Franciscan Ceramics, US, after 1934

The American ceramist Fance Franck (1931–2008) extensively researched copper red glazes in her workshop in Paris leading to the rediscovery of the Ming technique. She was supported by the Percival David Foundation of Chinese Art.
