= Ruskin Pottery =

English art pottery studio

Coordinates: 52.50257°N 1.99280°W

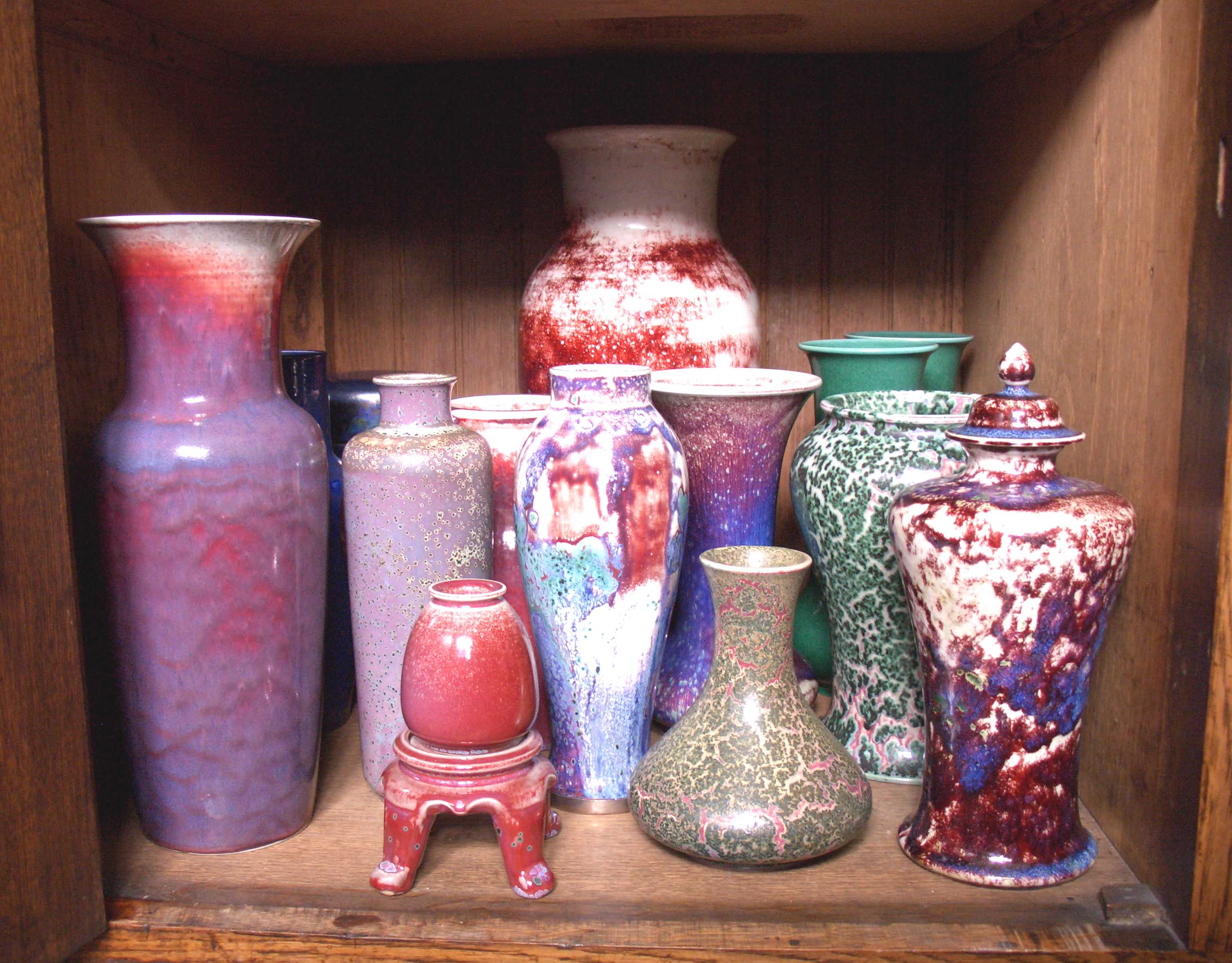
A selection of wares from the Ruskin Pottery in 'high fired' reduction glazes

A selection of the ceramic plaques made by the Ruskin Pottery

A group of Ruskin Pottery soufflé, 1905-1913

The Ruskin Pottery was an English art pottery studio founded in 1898 by Edward R. Taylor, the first principal of both the Lincoln School of Art and the Birmingham School of Art, to be run by his son, William Howson Taylor, formerly a student there. It was named after the artist, writer and social thinker John Ruskin, as the Taylors agreed with and followed the tenets of Ruskin. The pottery was situated at 173-174 Oldbury Road, Smethwick, then in Staffordshire (now part of Sandwell, in the West Midlands county).

The pottery produced was notable for the innovative glazes used on a range of brightly coloured pots, vases, buttons, bowls, tea services and jewellery. The ceramic glazes devised by William Howson Taylor included misty soufflé glazes, ice crystal effect glazes - 'crystalline', lustre glazes resembling metallic finishes, and the most highly regarded of all, sang-de-boeuf and flambé glazes which produced a blood red effect. The sang-de-boeuf glazes were created using reduction of copper and iron oxides at high temperature. This was a difficult technique, first developed in China in the 13th century and reinvented by several art potters in Europe in the late 19th century. William Howson Taylor was one of the principal exponents of 'high fired' techniques, producing a range of colours and unique 'fissured' glaze effects.

Having exhibited at home and at international fine art exhibitions, the award of a "grand prize" in 1904 at the St Louis International Exhibition, gave them the recognition they needed. Further awards were gained at other international exhibitions, including Milan 1906; Christchurch, New Zealand, 1907; London 1908; Brussels 1910; Turin 1911; Ghent 1913.

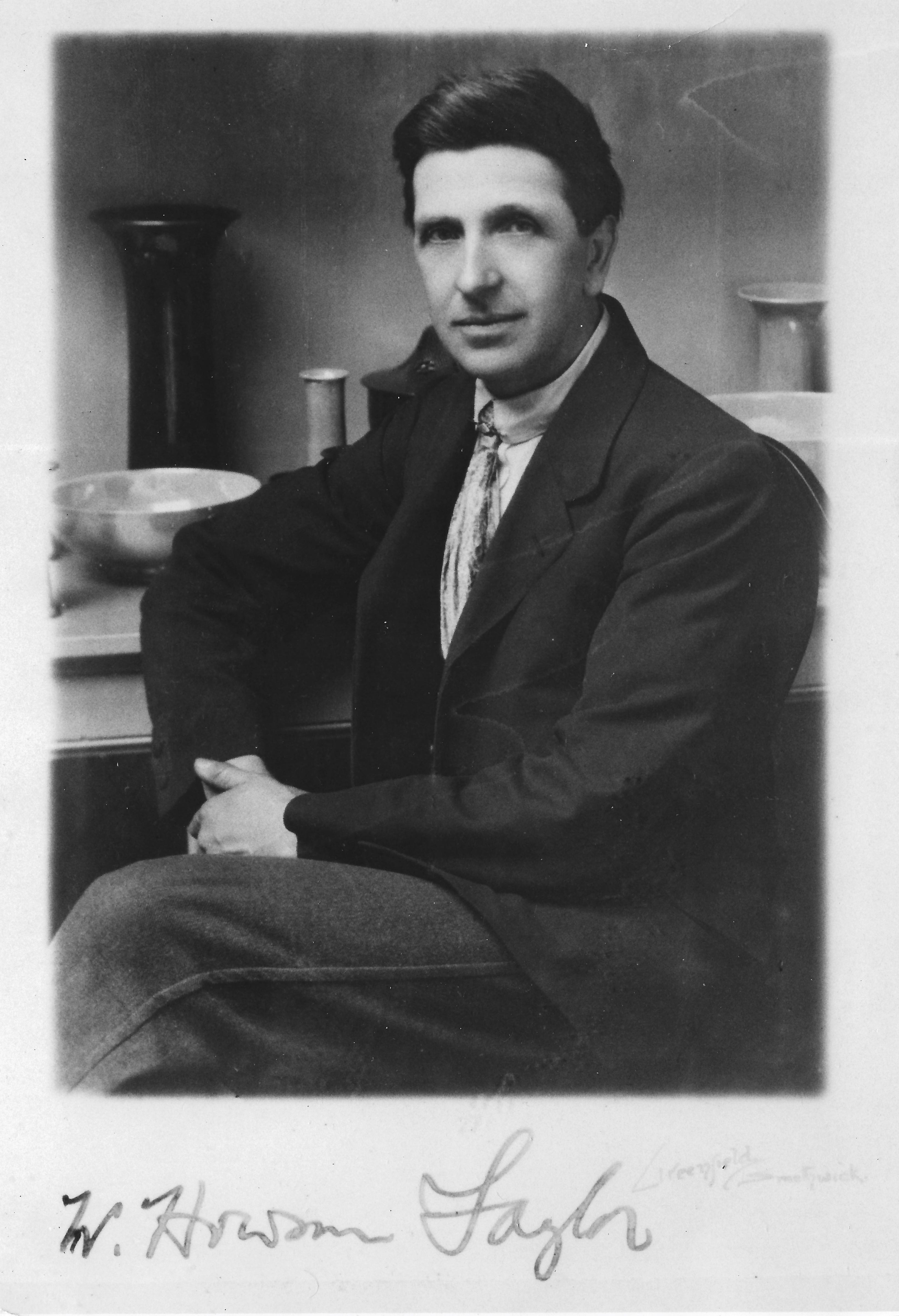
William Howson Taylor

When the studio closed in 1935 the formulae for the glazes and all the pottery documentation were deliberately destroyed, so that the unique Ruskin products could never be replicated.

A large collection of Ruskin Pottery is on public display at Wednesbury Museum and Art Gallery, Wednesbury, about 3.5 miles (5.6 km) north of the factory. The collection is owned by Sandwell Metropolitan Borough Council and is managed by Sandwell Museum Service.

The site of the factory is now an industrial estate, "Ruskin Place". A blue plaque marking the site, erected by the Smethwick Local History Society, was subsequently stolen.
