= Bezold–Brücke shift =

Change in hue perception

As intensity increases, colors with a dominant wavelength below ~500 nm (greenish cyans, cyans, and violets) shift towards blue, colors with a dominant wavelength above ~500 nm (reds, oranges, and greens) shift towards yellow.

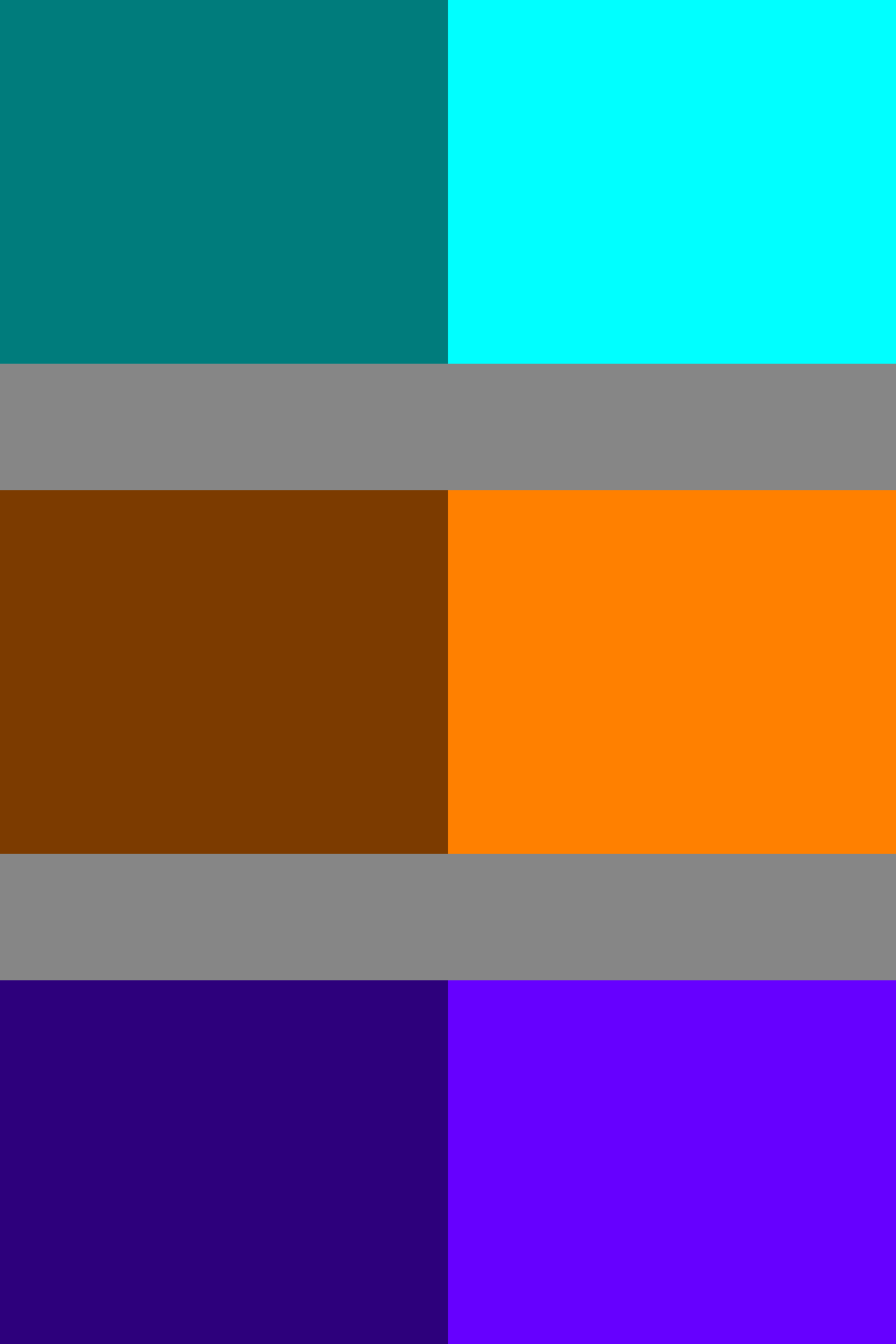
The colors on the left have the same chromaticity as their respective color on the right, with the only difference being the brightness. In cyan and violet, it can be seen that increasing the brightness shifts the hue towards blue; in orange, it shifts towards yellow.

The Bezold–Brücke shift or luminance-on-hue effect is a change in hue perception as the luminance (light intensity) of a color changes. As intensity increases, the apparent hue of stimuli of a constant spectral distribution shifts towards blue, if its dominant wavelength is below around 500 nm; or yellow, if its dominant wavelength is above 500 nm. As intensity is decreased, apparent hue shifts towards red or green.

The effect was noted in 1866 by physiologist Ernst Wilhelm von Brücke, and experimental investigations by physicist and meteorologist Wilhelm von Bezold were published in 1873. It was re-investigated more thoroughly by Donald McL. Purdy in 1931.

Stimuli of certain wavelengths ("invariant hues") retain their apparent hue despite changes in luminance; these have similar but not quite the same wavelengths as the unique hues red, yellow, blue, and green.

A similar hue shift, the Abney effect, occurs when a visual stimulus is mixed with white light. Both the Abney effect and the Bezold–Brücke shift apply not only to colors in isolation, but also to surface colors: for example, due to the Bezold–Brücke shift, the highlights and shadows of an object can appear to have different hues.

The shift in the hue is also accompanied by the changes in the perceived saturation. As the brightness of the color stimuli increases, their color strength also increases to a maximum point and then decreases again; in such a way that it is still wavelength specific. This can, to an extent, be considered as an inverse of the Helmholtz–Kohlrausch effect. In the case of the Helmholtz–Kohlrausch effect, the partially desaturated stimulus is seen to be brighter than fully saturated or achromatic stimulus.

== See also ==
- Opponent process
- Purkinje shift
- Abney effect

== Bibliography ==
- W. von Bezold: Die Farbenlehre in Hinblick auf Kunst und Kunstgewerbe. Braunschweig 1874. Full text scan
- "Über das Gesetz der Farbenmischung und die physiologischen Grundfarben", Annalen der Physiologischen Chemie, 1873, 226: 221–247.
- von Brücke, E. (1878). "Über einige Empfindungen im Gebiet der Sehnerven" [On some sensations in the region of the optic nerves]. Sitzungsberichte der Akademie der Wissenschaften in Wien, Mathematisch-Naturwissenschaftliche Klasse (in German). Abteilung 3. 77: 39–71.
