= Dominant wavelength =

Any monochromatic spectral light that evokes the corresponding perception of hue

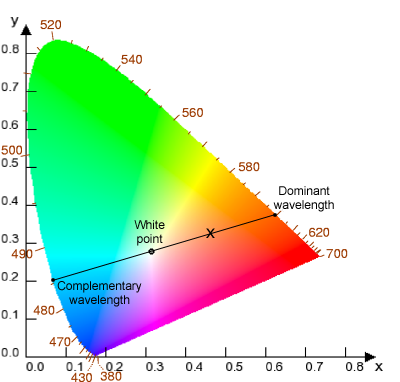
Dominant/complementary wavelength example on the CIE color space The "x" marks the color in question. For the white point indicated, the dominant wavelength for "x" is on the nearer perimeter, around 600 nm, while the complementary wavelength is opposite, around 485 nm. Intuitively, the dominant wavelength of "x" corresponds to the primary hue of "x".

In color science, the dominant wavelength is a method of approximating a color's hue. Along with purity, it makes up one half of the Helmholtz coordinates. The dominant wavelength of a given color is defined to be the wavelength of monochromatic spectral light that lies on the straight line passing through the white point and the given colour in the chromaticity diagram.

== Determination ==
=== Helmholtz coordinates ===
The Helmholtz coordinates are a polar coordinate system for defining a 2D chromaticity plane. The circumferential coordinate is the dominant wavelength, which is analogous to hue of the HSV color space. The radial coordinate is the purity, which is analogous to saturation of the HSV color space.

=== Color space ===
Not all color spaces can be used for determining the dominant wavelength of a color, because in most approximately perceptually uniform color spaces (such as CIELAB, Oklab, CIECAM02, etc) two colors with the same hue can have slightly different dominant wavelengths. Unless otherwise stated, the CIE 1931 color space (CIEXYZ) is used., but the CIELUV color space is sometimes used. The LMS color space can also be used for this purpose.

=== Calculation ===
To calculate the dominant wavelength of a chromaticity (or color), a half straight line is drawn on the chromaticity diagram that passes through the chromaticity's coordinates and starts in the white point (almost always, illuminant E, which is the equal energy white point). The line is then extrapolated so it intersects the perimeter of the diagram at one point, where the perimeter comprises the spectral locus or the line of purples. The point of intersection of that line and the spectral locus is the dominant wavelength. If the line intersects with the line of purples and not the spectral locus, the complementary wavelength is used. The purity can then be calculated as defined here.

=== White point ===
The white point is generally defined as—or assumed to be—equal energy white (illuminant E). This is defined as [x, y] = (1/3, 1/3) in CIE xyY, and as [X, Y, Z] = (1, 1, 1) in XYZ color space. However, other white points may be used, generally defined by "white" standard illuminants or a color temperature such as 6500K (D65).

=== Complementary wavelength ===
When the chromaticity lies within the triangle with vertices at the white point, extreme spectral violet (360 nm), and extreme spectral red (780 nm), the dominant wavelength is indeterminate because the half straight line that passes through the white point and that chromaticity point intersects the limit of the visible gamut in the line of purples instead of the spectral locus. The colors on the line of purples cannot be defined by wavelength because they do not represent monochromatic light.

Instead, the dominant wavelength is replaced with the complementary wavelength, which will represent the complementary color. To calculate it, the half straight line that starts on that chromaticity and passes through the white point is used; the intersection between this line and the spectral locus is the complementary wavelength. If a color doesn't have a dominant wavelength (and it is not achromatic), its complementary color will.

== Application ==
Dominant wavelength is used to define the color of light sources, such as the LEDs, that do not lie along the Planckian locus (which would otherwise be defined by color temperature). These light sources are also often described by their peak wavelength—the wavelength of highest radiometric spectral flux (highest peak in the power spectrum)—but the dominant wavelength is a photometric quantity, and therefore intuitively conveys what color the light will appear without relying on inexact color naming.

== See also ==
- Hue
- Colorfulness
- White point
