= Artipic =

Raster graphics editor

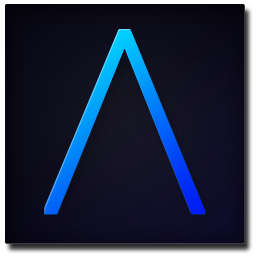
- Developer: Artipic AB
- Stable release: 2.9.2 / 20 December 2019; 5 years ago
- Operating system: Microsoft Windows
- Type: Raster graphics editor
- License: Proprietary
- Website: www.artipic.com

Artipic is a graphics editor developed for Microsoft Windows. An older version for macOS is still available but unsupported.

Artipic features drawing, editing, retouching, transforming and composing images including color corrections, effects and layer-based operations. It converts all common image formats and imports camera raw formats.

In the global image editing ecosystem Artipic can be positioned somewhere in the middle. It differs from simple free photo editors by more advanced capabilities, however it does not cover the complete professional-level functionality pack provided by industry leaders like Adobe Photoshop.

== History ==
Artipic developed by Swedish company Artipic AB. Artipic 1.0 was released in March 2014 as a free version. The first commercial version on Microsoft Windows was released in November 2014, on macOS – in October 2015.

== Features ==
- Supports Microsoft Windows and macOS
- Standard tools: select, crop, move, rotate, transform, stamp, color picking, text
- Advanced tools: custom brushes, gradients, shapes, paths, layers and masks
- Special tools: healing brush, red-eye effect reduction, dodge and burn brushes
- Adjustments: Brightness & Contrast, Hue & Saturation, Curves, Levels, Color Balance, Gamma Correction, Exposure, Color Temperature, Tint, Color Enhancer, Photo Filter Simulation, Posterization, Thresholding
- Filters: Smoothen, Sharpen, Vignetting, High-pass, Diffuse Glow, Shadow, Gaussian Blur
- Reversible (non-destructive) stylization presets
- Batch processing
- White balance
- RAW-converter including Gray Card
- Adobe Photoshop images supported

== Version history ==
Versions	Operating systems	Release date	Significant changes	Notes
2.1.1	Windows XP, 7, 8	August 22, 2014	First general availability release; Windows XP, Windows 7, Windows 8 support; Available at Windows Store	Beta Win Release was issued on June 11, 2014
2.2.0	Windows XP, 7, 8	November 10, 2014	New filters: High-pass, Diffuse Glow, Vignetting, Add noise; New adjustments: Tint, Color Temperature, Photo filters, Color enhancer, Threshold; Red-eye effect reduction	
2.2.2	Windows XP, 7, 8	March 26, 2015	Stabilization and performance improvements; Multi-language UI	
2.3.0	Windows XP, 7, 8	May 28, 2015	Loading images on layers or masks; RAW converter: Gray card; New RAW formats supported; PSD format supported; Batch processing: color profiles	
2.3.3	Windows XP, 7, 8, 10	August 3, 2015	Windows 10 support; Functionality to easier communicate with support (send report, etc.)	
2.3.0	OS X Yosemite	October 14, 2015	OS X Yosemite support	Beta Mac Release was issued on September 10, 2015
2.3.1	OS X Yosemite, El Capitan	November 24, 2015	OS X El Capitan support; Available at Mac App Store	
2.3.2	OS X Yosemite, El Capitan	March 16, 2016	Defect resolution	
2.4.1	Windows 7, 8, 10 OS X El Capitan, macOS Sierra	November 28, 2016	Dodge and Burn brushes; Refine edges; Feather selection; RAW conversion presets; Performance improvement; macOS Sierra support	
2.5	Windows 7, 8, 10 OS X El Capitan, macOS Sierra	May 22, 2017	Gradient preview; Popup sliders; Screen panning	
2.6	Windows 7, 8, 10 OS X El Capitan, macOS Sierra	October 30, 2017	Action history; White balance module	

== See also ==
- Image editing
- Comparison of raster graphics editors
