= Middle gray =

Shade of the color gray

50% CIELAB lightness
(Y = 18.4%)

In photography, painting, and other visual arts, middle gray or middle grey is a tone that is perceptually about halfway between black and white on a lightness scale; in photography and printing, it is typically defined as 18% reflectance in visible light.

Light meters, cameras, and pictures are often calibrated using an 18% gray card or a color reference card such as a ColorChecker. On the assumption that 18% is similar to the average reflectance of a scene, a gray card can be used to estimate the required exposure of the film.

== History ==
Following the Weber–Fechner law, at the start of the 20th century human lightness perception was assumed to be logarithmic. In 1903, The New International Encyclopædia illustrated this concept by stating that given a black and white with a luminance ratio of 1:60 ( : ), the geometric mean had to be used to find the middle gray. That is equivalent to a relative luminance of 12.9% ( ).

When Albert Henry Munsell was developing his color system, he tried to ascertain the relation between luminance and perceived lightness. As early as 1906, he wrote: 'Should we use logarithmic curve or curve of squares?' In 1920 Priest, Gibson, and McNicholas showed using both a König-Martens spectrophotometer and an apparatus designed by Gibson where the outputs of two photocells are balanced that the shades in Munsell's 1915 atlas followed a square root curve, which was later confirmed by extensive experiments. In Munsell's system, the shades of neutral gray were labelled N^{1} to N^{9}, with N^{5} in the middle and 0 and 10 denoting the unachievable ideal black and perfect white.

In 1933, Alexander Ector Orr Munsell (Albert Henry Munsell's son) found "that a series of neutral reflecting surfaces whose reflectances are...18.0...and 100.0 percent...form for the average observer a series of equal differences in value."

From the 1930s onward various lightness curves were proposed, but halfway through the 20th century, the proposals settled on cube-root-based curves. In 1976 the International Commission on Illumination defined the CIELAB color space, an extension of which would become the standard for the coming decades in a variety of applications. Following research in the 80s and 90s, more and more advanced models of color vision were developed, the first major step being CIECAM97s; see Lightness § 1933 for details.

== Table of middle grays ==
Below are various "middle" grays based on various criteria.

The shades in the rightmost column will only be correct if viewed on a calibrated monitor.

Note that LCD screens, even when correctly calibrated, often have a brightness that varies considerably depending on the viewing angle.

Middle gray as defined by	Year	CIE XYZ linear relative luminance (Y)	Appearance
Geomean of 60:1	1903	12.91%	
Munsell, Sloan & Godlove	1933	18%	
CIELAB	1976	18.42%	
sRGB	1996	21.40%	
Munsell's original N^{5}	1906	25.00%	
NCS S 5000-N	1964	26%	
Mac, pre-OS X 10.6	1984	≈ 30%	
CIECAM02 lightness	2002	*	
CIECAM97s lightness	1997	*	
50% Luminance	1931	50.00%	

Quarter luminance list (typical monitor calibrated to 2.2 gamma, 50% luminance gray has RGB hex 0xBA value, which is 0.5^(1/2.2)*255)

Middle gray as defined by	Year	CIE XYZ linear relative luminance	Appearance
100% Luminance	1931	100%	
75% Luminance	1931	75%	
50% Luminance	1931	50%	
25% Luminance	1931	25%	
0% Luminance	1931	0%	

* Context-dependent; an estimate is displayed here taking the environment where it appears in the article into account and assuming a neutrally lit surround of 200 cd/m^{2}.
