= Colour cast =

Colour imbalance of a photograph

A colour cast is a tint of a particular colour, usually unwanted, that evenly affects a photographic image in whole or in part.

Certain types of light can cause film and digital cameras to render a colour cast. Illuminating a subject with light sources of different colour temperatures will usually cause colour cast problems in the shadows. The human eye generally does not notice the unnatural colour, because our eyes and brains adjust and compensate for different types of light in ways that cameras cannot.

In film, colour casts can also be caused by problems in photo development. Improper timing or imbalanced chemical mixtures can cause unwanted casts.

Colour casts can also occur in old photographs due to fading of dyes, particularly under the action of ultraviolet light. These may be correctable on a scanned version of the photograph with image editing techniques.

== Solutions ==
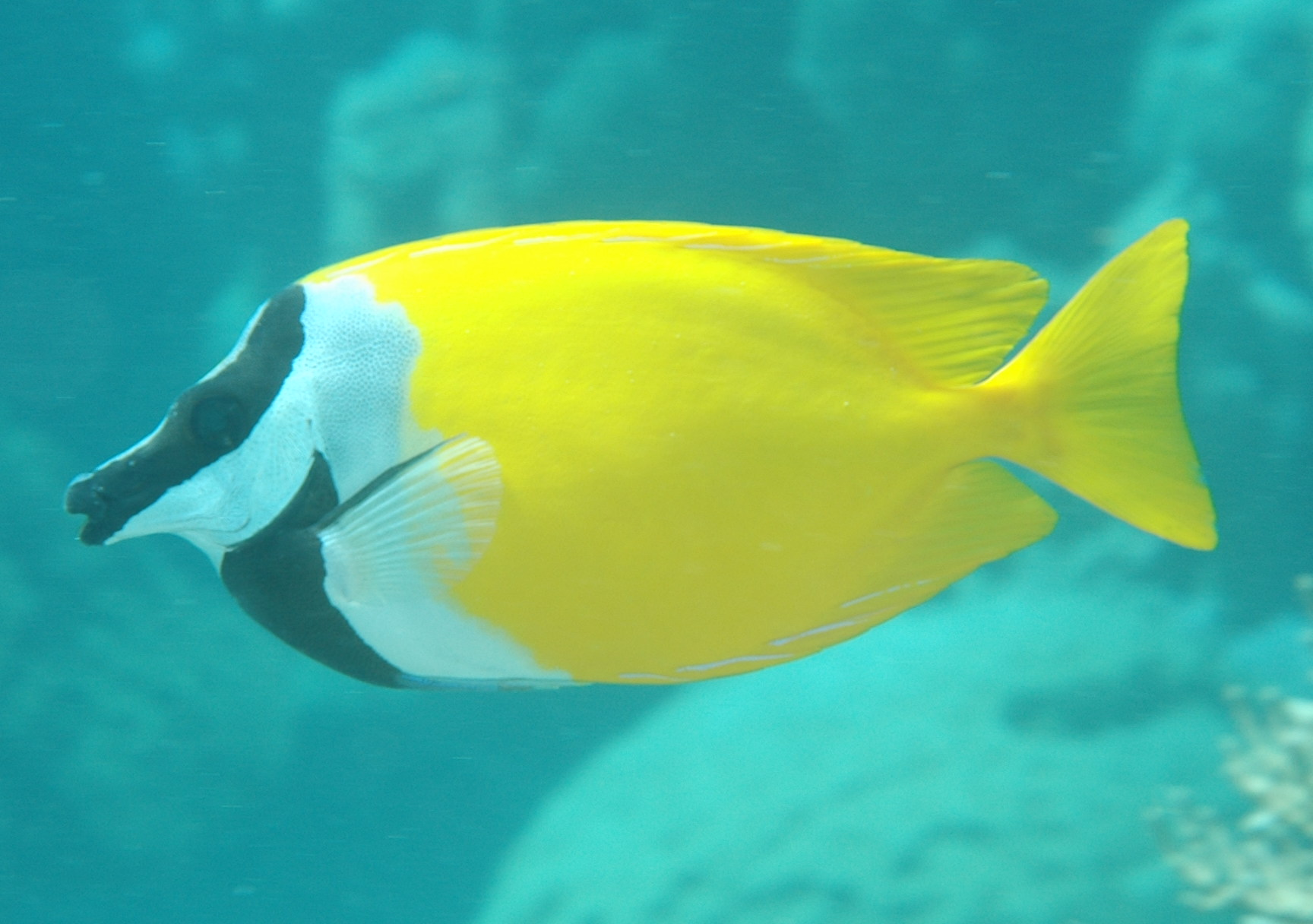
Example of a photo with a uniformly green colour cast due to differential absorption of light before reaching certain depths at sea

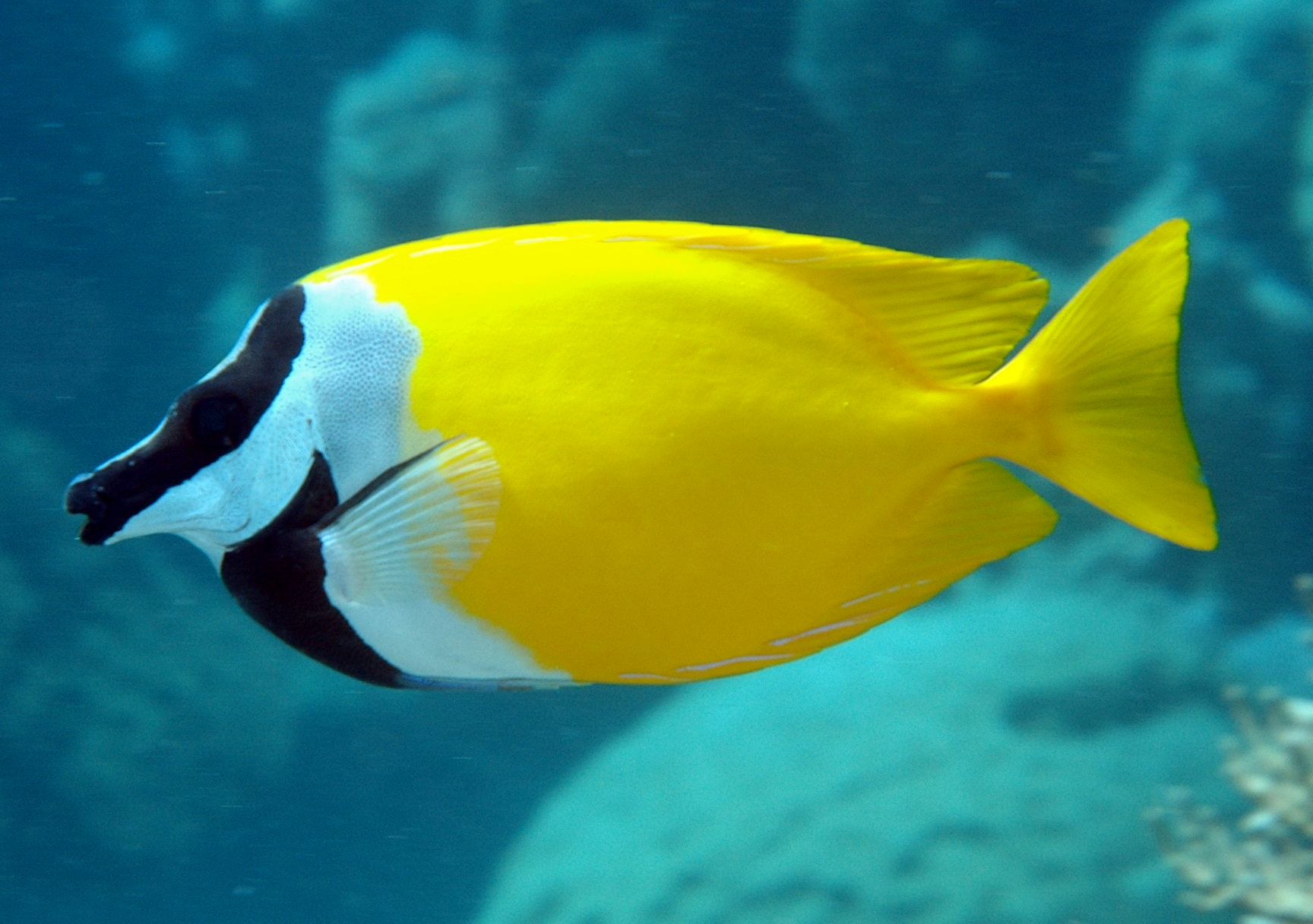
The same photo with the colour cast corrected

Most digital cameras try to automatically detect and compensate colour cast and usually have a selection of manually set white balance settings to choose from. Otherwise, photo editing programs, such as Photoshop, often have built in colour correction facilities. For film, blue filters and amber filters are used to counter casts. Amber filters are used to reduce the blueish tint caused by daylight. Blue filters reduce the orange colour caused by incandescent light.

A variety of coloured filters in varying degrees of intensity are available. Kodak's amber filters, for example, vary from palest yellow ("81C") to deepest amber ("85B"). A photographer chooses which filter to use based on the quality of the ambient light. Colour temperature meters can read the temperature of the existing lighting conditions and guide the selection of the filter. Clouded sky, for example, requires a paler amber than clear blue sky. If a filter is unavailable, using a flash is an alternative solution which usually provides enough neutral white light to counter the cast.

In the case of film, if photographs all contain the same cast, it is usually indicative of improper chemical development. If the film itself does not contain any cast, it can be reused to create another set of photographs in proper chemical conditions. If the film contains a cast, filters can be used during photo processing to correct it.

== Gallery ==
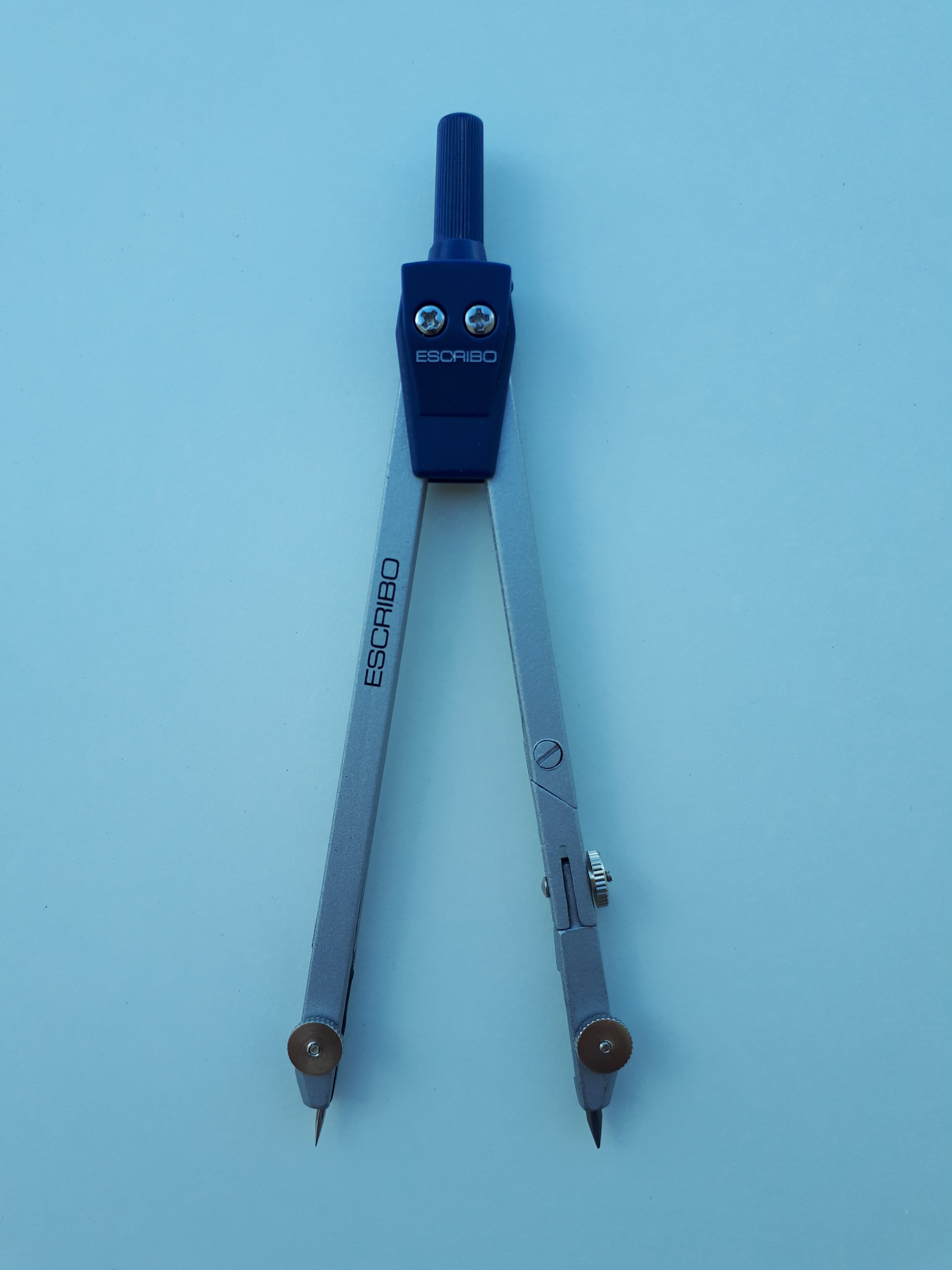

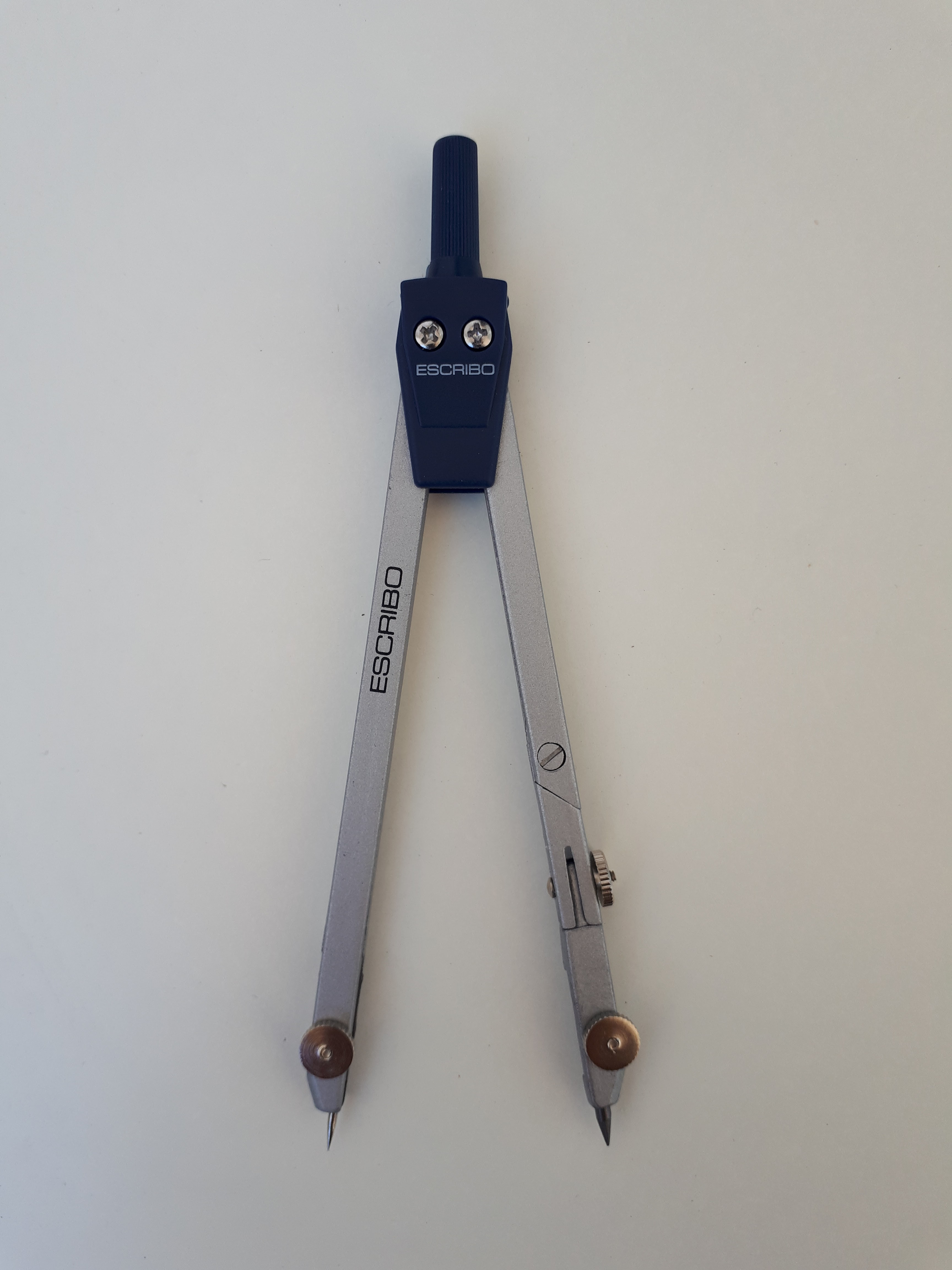

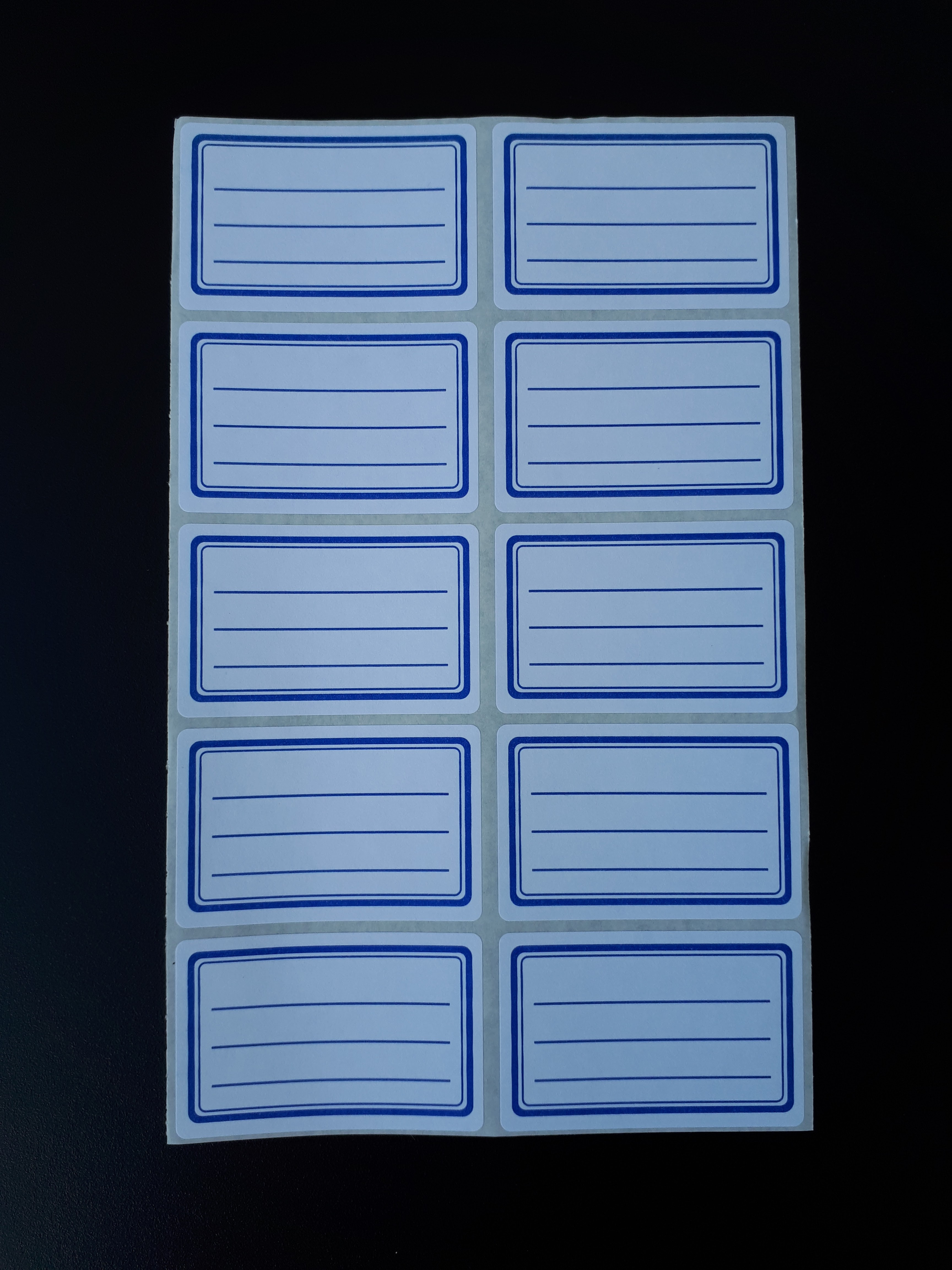

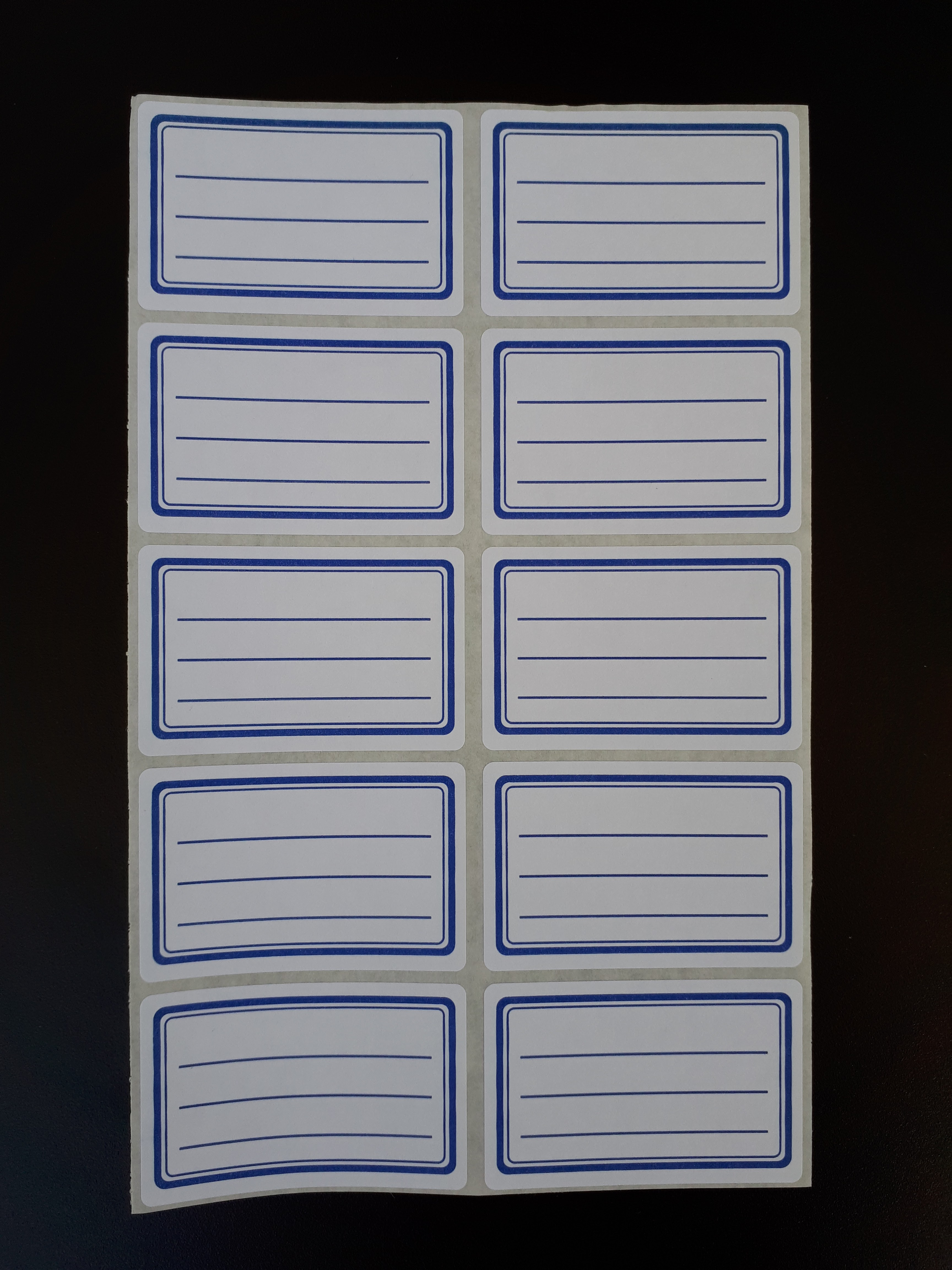

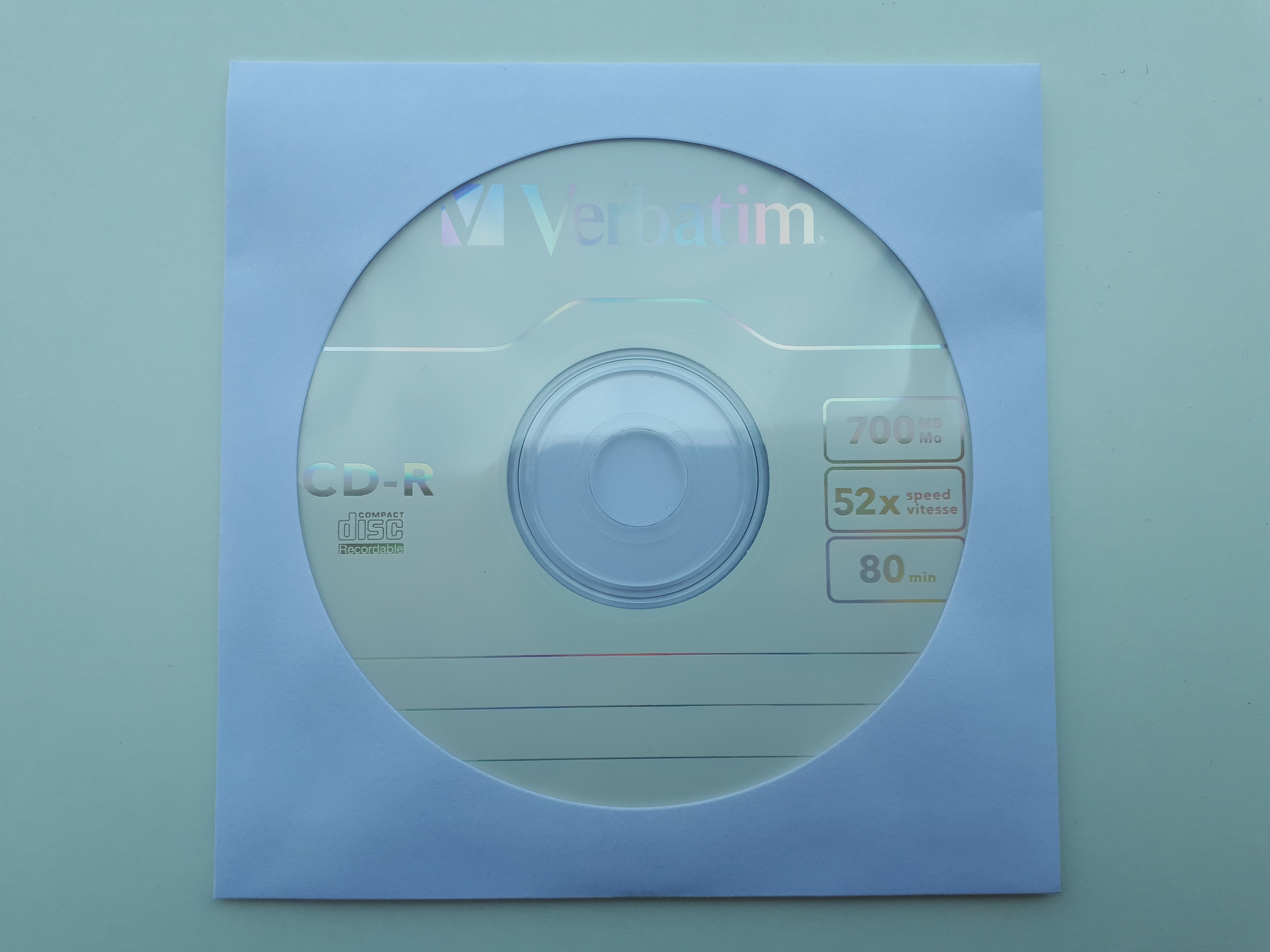

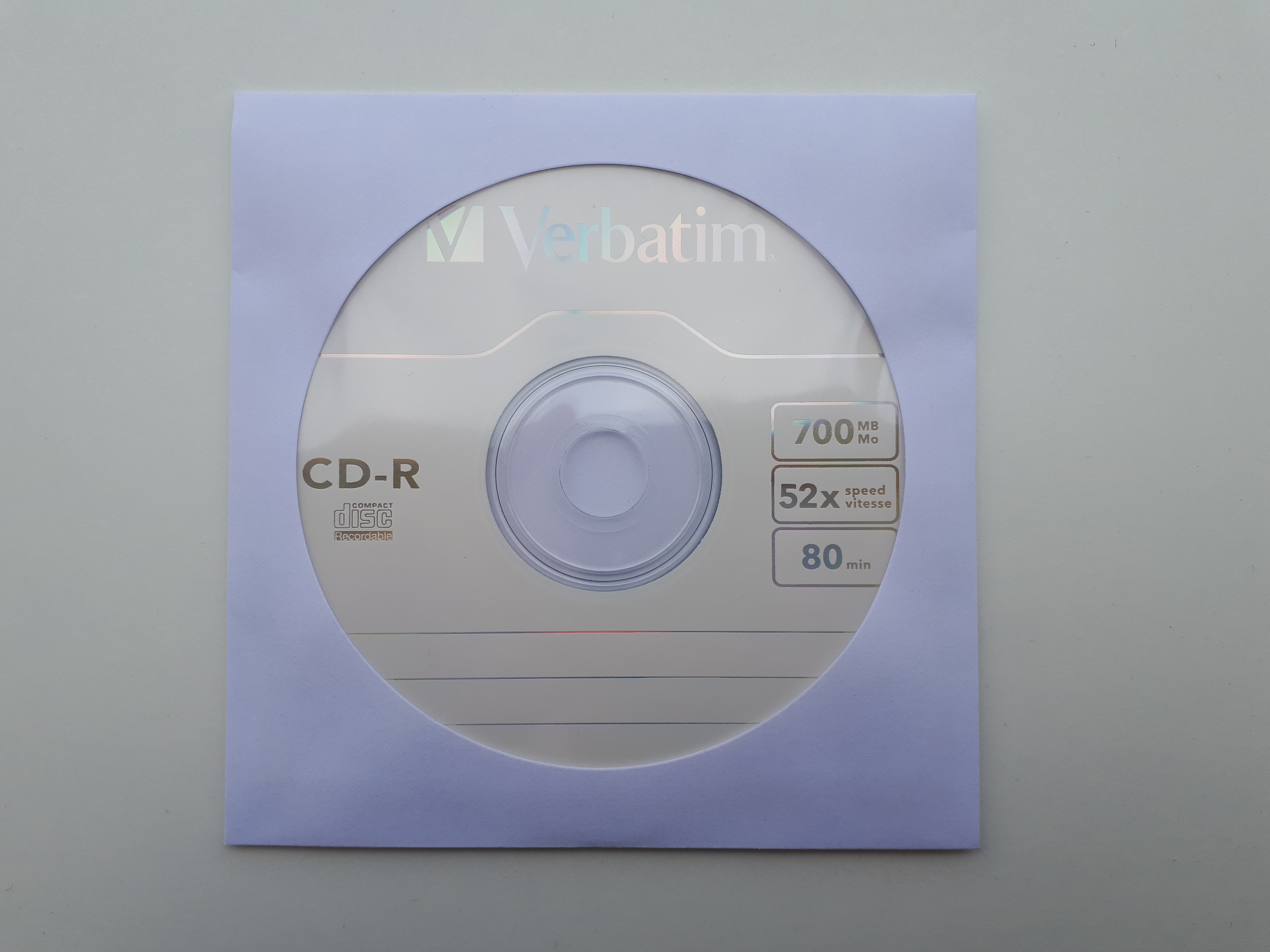

== See also ==
- Colour balance
- Colour temperature
