= Parry Moon =

American electrical engineer

Parry H. Moon
- Born: Parry Hiram Moon; February 14, 1898; Beaver Dam, Wisconsin, U.S.
- Died: March 4, 1988 (aged 90); Boston, Massachusetts, U.S.
- Education: University of Wisconsin; MIT
- Known for: Contributions to electromagnetic field theory Holors
- Awards: 1974 Illuminating Engineering Society's Gold Medal
- Scientific career
- Fields: Electrical engineer
- Workplaces: MIT

Parry Hiram Moon (/muːn/; February 14, 1898 – March 4, 1988) was an American electrical engineer who, with Domina Eberle Spencer, co-wrote eight scientific books and over 200 papers on subjects including electromagnetic field theory, color harmony, nutrition, aesthetic measure and advanced mathematics. He also developed a theory of holors.

== Biography ==
Moon was born in Beaver Dam, Wisconsin, to Ossian C. and Eleanor F. (Parry) Moon. He received a BSEE from University of Wisconsin in 1922 and an MSEE from MIT in 1924. Unfulfilled with his work in transformer design at Westinghouse, Moon obtained a position as research assistant at MIT under Vannevar Bush. He was hospitalized for six months after sustaining injuries from experimental work in the laboratory. He later continued his teaching and research as an associate professor in MIT's Electrical Engineering Department. He married Harriet Tiffany, with whom he had a son. In 1961, after the death of his first wife, he married his co-author, collaborator and former student, Domina Eberle Spencer, a professor of mathematics. They had one son. Moon retired from full-time teaching in the 1960s, but continued his research until his death in 1988.

== Scientific contributions ==
Moon's early career focused in optics applications for engineers. Collaborating with Spencer, he began researching electromagnetism and Amperian forces. The quantity of papers that followed culminated in Foundations of Electrodynamics, unique for its physical insights, and two field theory books, which became standard references for many years. Much later, Moon and Spencer unified the approach to collections of data (vectors, tensors, etc.), with a concept they coined "holors". Through their work, they became disillusioned with Albert Einstein's theory of relativity and sought neo-classical explanations for various phenomena.

=== Holors ===
Moon and Spencer invented the term "holor" (/ˈhoʊlər/; Greek ὅλος "whole") for a mathematical entity that is made up of one or more "independent quantities", or "merates" (/ˈmɪəreɪts/; Greek μέρος "part") as they are called in the theory of holors. In modern parlance, holors are precisely multidimensional arrays of real numbers, and the terminology of holors is very rarely encountered. See the appendix of for a concise description of holors.

== Bibliography ==
=== Books ===
- Parry Moon, The Scientific Basis of Illuminating Engineering, McGraw-Hill, 608pp. (1936) (ASIN B000J2QFAI).
- Parry Moon, Lighting Design, Addison-Wesley Press, 191pp. (1948) (ASIN B0007DZUFA).
- Parry Moon, A Proposed Musical Notation, (1952) (ASIN B0007JY81G).
- Parry Moon & Domina Eberle Spencer, Foundations of Electrodynamics, D. Van Nostrand Co., 314pp. (1960) (ASIN B000OET7UQ).
- Parry Moon & Domina Eberle Spencer, Field Theory for Engineers, D. Van Nostrand Co., 540pp. (1961) (ISBN 978-0442054892).
- Parry Moon & Domina Eberle Spencer, Field Theory Handbook: Including Coordinate Systems, Differential Equations and Their Solutions, Spring Verlag, 236pp. (1961) (ISBN 978-0387184302).
- Parry Moon & Domina Eberle Spencer, Vectors, D. Van Nostrand Co., 334pp. (1965) (ASIN B000OCMWTW).
- Parry Moon & Domina Eberle Spencer, Partial Differential Equations, D. C. Heath, 322pp. (1969) (ASIN B0006DXDVE).
- Parry Moon, The Abacus: Its History, Its Design, Its Possibilities in the Modern World, D. Gordon & Breach Science Pub., 179pp. (1971) (ISBN 978-0677019604).
- Parry Moon & Domina Eberle Spencer, The Photic Field, MIT Press, 267pp. (1981) (ISBN 978-0262131667).
- Parry Moon & Domina Eberle Spencer, Theory of Holors, Cambridge University Press, 392pp. (1986) (ISBN 978-0521245852).

=== Papers ===
- Parry Moon & Domina Eberle Spencer (1953). "Binary Stars and the Velocity of Light". Journal of the Optical Society of America. 43 (8): 635–641. Bibcode:1953JOSA...43..635M. doi:10.1364/JOSA.43.000635.
- Parry Moon & Domina Eberle Spencer (March 1954). "Electromagnetism Without Magnetism: An Historical Approach". American Journal of Physics. 22 (3): 120–124. doi:10.1119/1.1933645.
- Parry Moon & Domina Eberle Spencer (1954). "Interpretation of the Ampere Experiments". Journal of the Franklin Institute. 257 (3): 203–220. doi:10.1016/0016-0032(54)90578-5.
- Parry Moon & Domina Eberle Spencer (1954). "The Coulomb Force and the Ampere Force". Journal of the Franklin Institute. 257 (4): 305–315. doi:10.1016/0016-0032(54)90621-3.
- Parry Moon & Domina Eberle Spencer (1954). "A New Electrodynamics". Journal of the Franklin Institute. 257 (5): 369–382. doi:10.1016/0016-0032(54)90728-0.
- Parry Moon & Domina Eberle Spencer (1955). "A Postulational Approach to Electromagnetism". Journal of the Franklin Institute. 259 (4): 293–305. doi:10.1016/0016-0032(55)90638-4.
- Parry Moon & Domina Eberle Spencer (1955). "On Electromagnetic Induction". Journal of the Franklin Institute. 260 (3): 213–226. doi:10.1016/0016-0032(55)90735-3.
- Parry Moon & Domina Eberle Spencer (1955). "On the Ampere Force". Journal of the Franklin Institute. 260 (4): 295–311. doi:10.1016/0016-0032(55)90875-9.
- Parry Moon & Domina Eberle Spencer (1955). "Some Electromagnetic Paradoxes". Journal of the Franklin Institute. 260 (5): 373–395. doi:10.1016/0016-0032(55)90140-X.
- Parry Moon & Domina Eberle Spencer (1956). "On the Establishment of Universal Time". Philosophy of Science. 23 (3): 216–229. doi:10.1086/287487. S2CID 121272117.
- Parry Moon & Domina Eberle Spencer (1958). "The Cosmological Principle and the Cosmological Constant". Journal of the Franklin Institute. 266: 47–58. doi:10.1016/0016-0032(58)90811-1.
- Parry Moon & Domina Eberle Spencer (1958). "Retardation in Cosmology". Philosophy of Science. 25 (4): 287–292. doi:10.1086/287618. S2CID 120449655.
- Parry Moon & Domina Eberle Spencer (1958). "Mach's Principle". Philosophy of Science. 6: 125–134.
