= Domina Eberle Spencer =

American mathematician

Domina Eberle Spencer (September 26, 1920 – 2022) was an American mathematician who was Professor at the University of Connecticut.

== Biography ==
Spencer was born on September 26, 1920, and earned her Ph.D. in 1942 from the Massachusetts Institute of Technology under the supervision of Dirk Jan Struik. She worked on electrodynamics and field theory.

Spencer made significant contributions to the field of lighting design research, particularly through her research on the visual perception of light. Working alongside her husband, Parry Moon, Spencer co-authored several books and papers that explored various aspects of electrodynamics, field theory and introduced holors. Their collaborative work, such as The Photic Field (1981), delved into the physical and physiological effects of light, providing a foundational understanding that has influenced modern lighting standards and practices.

Spencer's research extended to practical applications in lighting, contributing to the development of more efficient and visually comfortable lighting systems. Her work is recognized for integrating rigorous scientific principles with practical engineering solutions, enhancing the quality and functionality of lighting in various environments. Additionally, her contributions are noted in discussions on lighting design innovations, as highlighted by peers in the Illuminating Engineering Society (IES), who acknowledge her influence on contemporary lighting research and standards. She was awarded the distinction of IES Fellow in 1962 for valuable contributions to the art and science of illumination. Her death, at age 101, was reported by the University of Connecticut in May 2022.

== Bibliography ==
=== Books ===
- Parry Moon, The Scientific Basis of Illuminating Engineering, McGraw-Hill, 608pp. (1936) (ASIN B000J2QFAI).
- Parry Moon, Lighting Design, Addison-Wesley Press, 191pp. (1948) (ASIN B0007DZUFA).
- Parry Moon, A Proposed Musical Notation, (1952) (ASIN B0007JY81G).
- Parry Moon & Domina Eberle Spencer, Foundations of Electrodynamics, D. Van Nostrand Co., 314pp. (1960) (ASIN B000OET7UQ).
- Parry Moon & Domina Eberle Spencer, Field Theory for Engineers, D. Van Nostrand Co., 540pp. (1961) (ISBN 978-0-442-05489-2).
- Parry Moon & Domina Eberle Spencer, Field Theory Handbook: Including Coordinate Systems, Differential Equations and Their Solutions, Spring Verlag, 236pp. (1961) (ISBN 978-0-387-18430-2).
- Parry Moon & Domina Eberle Spencer, Vectors, D. Van Nostrand Co., 334pp. (1965) (ASIN B000OCMWTW).
- Parry Moon & Domina Eberle Spencer, Partial Differential Equations, D. C. Heath, 322pp. (1969) (ASIN B0006DXDVE).
- Parry Moon & Domina Eberle Spencer, The Photic Field, MIT Press, 267pp. (1981) (ISBN 978-0-262-13166-7).
- Parry Moon & Domina Eberle Spencer, Theory of Holors, Cambridge University Press, 392pp. (1986) (ISBN 978-0-521-24585-2).

=== Papers ===
- Parry Moon & Domina Eberle Spencer (1953). "Binary Stars and the Velocity of Light". Journal of the Optical Society of America. 43 (8): 635–641. doi:10.1364/JOSA.43.000635
- Parry Moon & Domina Eberle Spencer (March 1954). "Electromagnetism Without Magnetism: An Historical Approach". American Journal of Physics. 22 (3): 120–124. doi:10.1119/1.1933645.
- Parry Moon & Domina Eberle Spencer (1954). "Interpretation of the Ampere Experiments". Journal of the Franklin Institute. 257 (3): 203–220. doi:10.1016/0016-0032(54)90578-5
- Parry Moon & Domina Eberle Spencer (1954). "The Coulomb Force and the Ampere Force". Journal of the Franklin Institute. 257 (4): 305–315. doi:10.1016/0016-0032(54)90621-3
- Parry Moon & Domina Eberle Spencer (1954). "A New Electrodynamics". Journal of the Franklin Institute. 257 (5): 369–382. doi:10.1016/0016-0032(54)90728-0
- Parry Moon & Domina Eberle Spencer (1955). "A Postulational Approach to Electromagnetism". Journal of the Franklin Institute. 259 (4): 293–305. doi:10.1016/0016-0032(55)90638-4
- Parry Moon & Domina Eberle Spencer (1955). "On Electromagnetic Induction". Journal of the Franklin Institute. 260 (3): 213–226. doi:10.1016/0016-0032(55)90735-3
- Parry Moon & Domina Eberle Spencer (1955). "On the Ampere Force". Journal of the Franklin Institute. 260 (4): 295–311. doi:10.1016/0016-0032(55)90875-9
- Parry Moon & Domina Eberle Spencer (1955). "Some Electromagnetic Paradoxes". Journal of the Franklin Institute. 260 (5): 373–395. doi:10.1016/0016-0032(55)90140-X
- Parry Moon & Domina Eberle Spencer (1956). "On the Establishment of Universal Time". Philosophy of Science. 23 (3): 216–229. doi:10.1086/287487. S2CID 121272117
- Parry Moon & Domina Eberle Spencer (1958). "The Cosmological Principle and the Cosmological Constant". Journal of the Franklin Institute. 266: 47–58. doi:10.1016/0016-0032(58)90811-1
- Parry Moon & Domina Eberle Spencer (1958). "Retardation in Cosmology". Philosophy of Science. 25 (4): 287–292. doi:10.1086/287618. S2CID 120449655
- Parry Moon & Domina Eberle Spencer (1958). "Mach's Principle". Philosophy of Science. 6: 125–134.
