= Gray card =

Reflectance reference used in photography

18% gray card (Note: For a precise rendering on a sRGB monitor, see the table in the entry for middle gray.)

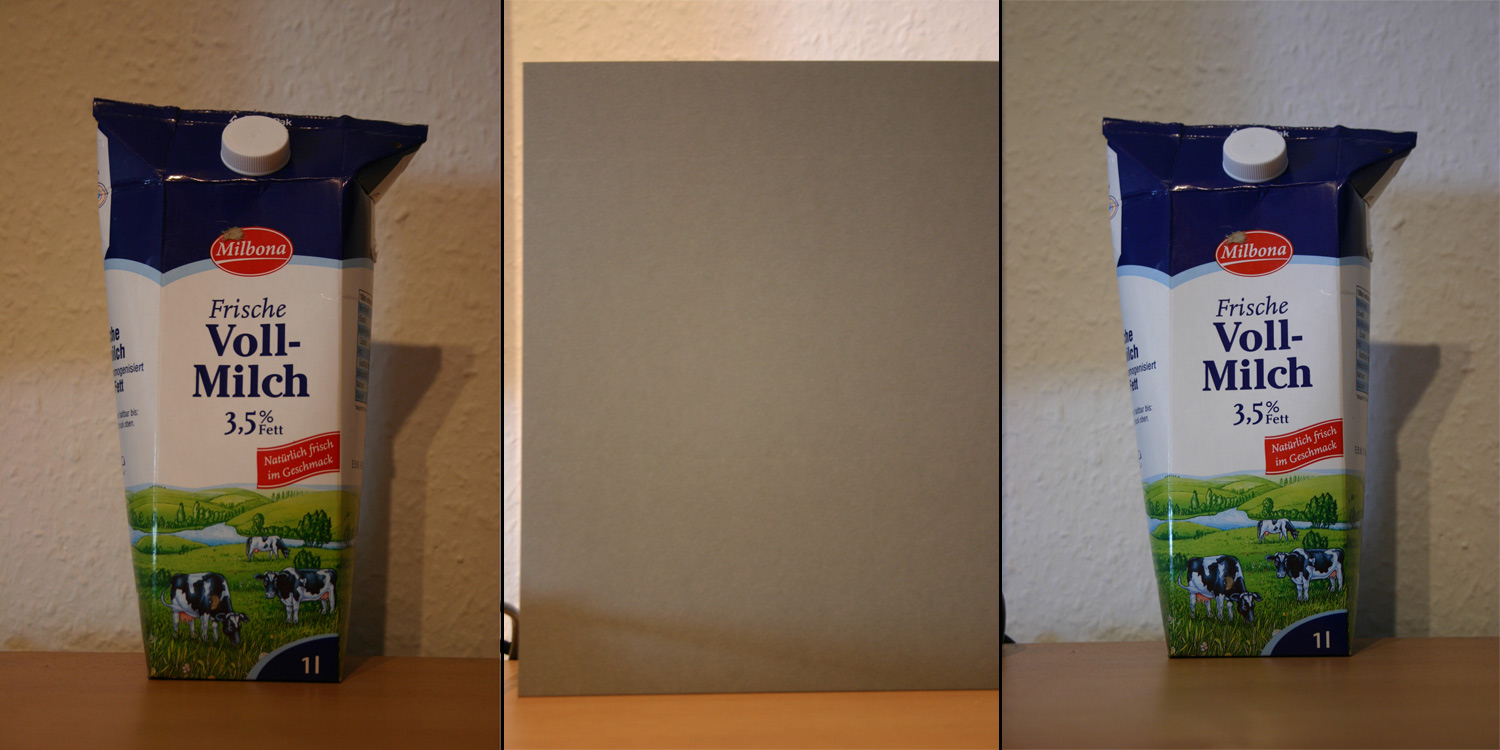
Image before (left) and after (right) adjustment with gray card (middle)

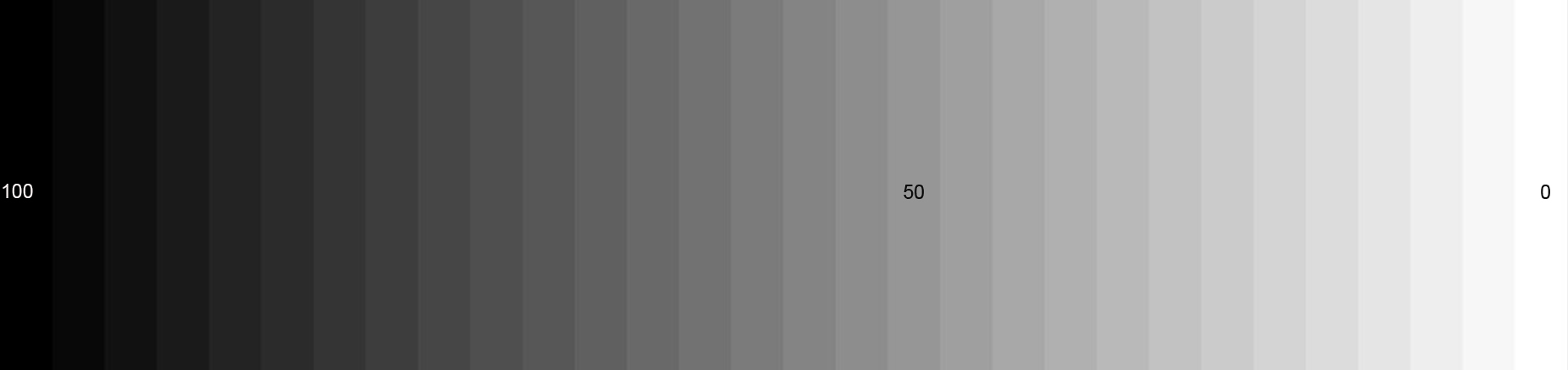
Gray card from 100 to 0 in 30 steps.

A gray card is a middle gray reference, typically used together with a reflective light meter, as a way to produce consistent image exposure and/or color in video production, film, and photography.

A gray card is a flat object of a neutral-gray color that derives from a flat reflectance spectrum. A typical example is the Kodak R-27 set, which contains one 8 in × 10 in (20 cm × 25 cm) card and one 4 in × 5 in (10 cm × 13 cm) card, each with an 18% reflectance across the visible spectrum, and a white reverse side with a 90% reflectance. Note that flat spectral reflectance is a stronger condition than simply appearing neutral; this flatness ensures that the card always has the same color as its illuminant (see metamerism).

== Application ==
Gray cards are used in a variety of ways by photographers, cinematographers, video engineers and video camera operators.

=== Photography ===
A primary use of gray cards is to provide a standard reference object for exposure determination in photography. A gray card is an (approximate) realization of a Lambertian scatterer; its apparent brightness (and exposure determination) therefore depends only on its orientation relative to the light source. To establish the exposure for a photograph Kodak recommends placing the grey card as close to the subject as possible and "aiming the surface of the grey card toward a point one third of the compound angle between the camera and the main light. For example, if the main light is located 30 degrees to the side and 45 degrees up from the camera-to subject axis, aim the card 10 degrees to the side and 15 degrees up." The card should be metered from approximately six inches (15 cm) away. Once a meter reading has been obtained, Kodak further recommends adjusting the exposure parameters using these criteria:

- For subjects of normal reflectance, increase the indicated exposure by one half stop.
- For light subjects, use the indicated exposure; for very light subjects, decrease exposure by one half stop.
- If the subject is dark to very dark, increase the indicated exposure by one- to one-and-one-half stops.

If the light is too dim for the meter to respond to the gray side, Kodak suggests dividing the film speed by five and reading the white side of the card, or reading the white side at the normal setting and using a lens opening 2 1/3 stops larger than indicated. The card can also be used to measure lighting ratios, by taking one reading with the main and fill lights on and another with the fill light alone; Kodak suggests that for full detail the ratio should generally not exceed 3:1 for color or 5:1 for black-and-white photographs.

This technique is similar to using an incident meter, as it depends on the illuminance but not the reflectivity of the subject. In daylight, Kodak advises aiming the card in the same way, treating the sun as the main light; in shade, under overcast skies or with backlighting, the brightest area in front of the subject, usually the sky, is treated as the main light.

In addition to providing a means for measuring exposure, a gray card provides a convenient reference for white balance, or color balance, allowing the camera to compensate for the illuminant color in a scene.

Gray cards can be used for in-camera white balance or post-processing white balance. Many digital cameras have a custom white balance feature. A photo of the gray card is taken and used to set white balance for a sequence of photos. For post-processing white balance, a photo of the gray card in the scene is taken, and the image processing software uses the data from the pixels in the gray card area of the photo to set the white balance point for the whole image.

In motion-picture work, Kodak recommends shooting a gray card before every major lighting setup to give the laboratory exposure and color-balance information; because the card reflects red, green and blue in equal amounts, it simplifies postproduction and color grading. With tungsten-balanced film in tungsten studio lighting this is straightforward, but in daylight the light chosen to illuminate the card determines what is rendered as neutral: lighting the card with skylight while blocking the sun makes the sunlight appear warmer, while shooting it in sunlight renders the sun as neutral.

Gray cards are made of a variety of materials including fabric, plastic, paper, and foam.

== Limitations ==
A gray card is useful for setting or correcting the balance of neutral colors, as well as for exposure. Other charts, such as various color charts, provide standard reference patterns with calibrated reflectance spectrum and color coordinates, for use in adjusting color rendering in a larger range of situations.
