= Von Kries =

Von Kries may refer to:

- Achim von Kries
- Johannes von Kries
- Von Kries Coefficient Law
