= EciRGB =

One of the standard RGB color spaces

eciRGB is one of the standard RGB color spaces. It is recommended by the ECI (European Color Initiative) as a working color space for professional image editing and covers virtually all printing processes as well as all common display techniques. This fulfilled the requirements for a particular color-correct production in the graphics industry. The corresponding ICC profile for inclusion in image editing programs or for the calibration of the monitor can be obtained free of charge from the ECI website.
