= ICAM =

ICAM may refer to:

- ICAM (TV series), an Australian Indigenous affairs program that aired from 1995 until 2002
- iCAM (color appearance model), an image color appearance model
- Institut catholique d'arts et métiers, a French Engineering School
- Institut des cultures arabes et méditerranéennes
- Institute for Complex Adaptive Matter
- Integrated Computer-Aided Manufacturing
- Intercellular adhesion molecule
- International Confederation of Architectural Museums
- Mexican Catholic Apostolic Church, or the Iglesia Católica Apostólica Mexicana a schismatic Mexican religious group
