= Von Kries coefficient law =

The von Kries coefficient law in color adaptation describes the relationship between the illuminant and the human visual system sensitivity. The law accounts for the approximate color constancy in the human visual system. It is the oldest and most widely used law to quantify color adaptation, and is used widely in the field of vision and chromatic adaptation.

The von Kries coefficient law compensates for the illumination change using a purely diagonal scaling of the cone absorptions. While the law does not provide a precise indication of the correction, it typically provides a reasonable approximation.

== History ==
=== Helmholtz and the Young–Helmholtz theory ===
The von Kries coefficient law built upon theories and research done by Hermann von Helmholtz. A German physicist and physician, Helmholtz asserted that “the nervous substance in question is less sensitive to reacting light falling on it than the rest of the retina that was not previously stimulated”. Helmholtz, along with Thomas Young, proposed the trichromatic theory, or the Young–Helmholtz theory, that stated that the retina contains three types of cones, which respond to light of three different wavelengths, corresponding to red, green, or blue. Activation of these cones in different combinations and to different degrees results in the perception of other colors.

=== Experiments ===
While von Kries and the other researchers did not have the means to test out the results of his stated law, others tested out his coefficient law by estimating the eigenvectors of the measured linear transformations. Many researchers, including Eileen Wassof (1959), Burnham et al. (1957), and Macadam [12] rejected his law as being insufficiently accurate. There were frequently reported systematic discrepancies between prediction and experiment.

== Chromatic adaptation ==
The law assumes that although the responses of the three cone types (R, G, and B) are affected differently by chromatic adaptation, the spectral sensitivities of each of the three cone mechanisms remains unchanged. Therefore, if one of the three cones is less stimulated than the others, the sensitivity is proportionally reduced. The specific amount that this number is reduced by is inversely related to the relative strengths of activation by the energy distribution of the particular light in question.

=== Equations ===
The von Kries coefficient law can be expressed by the following equations:

$R_c = R$ α
$G_c = G$ β
$B_c = B$ γ

, where $R_c, G_c,$ and $B_c$ are the cone responses of the same observer, and $R, G,$ and $B$ are all cone responses of the same observer; the only difference is that $R_c, G_c,$ and $B_c$ are viewed under a reference illuminant while the other set of values is experimental. α, β, and γ are the von Kries coefficients corresponding to the reduction in sensitivity of the three cone mechanisms due to chromatic adaptation.

If $R_{wr}, G_{wr},$ and $B_{wr}$ are defined as the cone responses for the reference white under the reference illuminants, and $R_{w}, G_{w},$ and $B_{w}$ are cone responses for the test illuminants, then

$$\frac{R}{R_w} = \frac{R_{c}}{R_{wr}}$$

$$\frac{G}{G_w} = \frac{G_{c}}{G_{wr}}$$

$$\frac{B}{B_w} = \frac{B_{c}}{B_{wr}}$$

Using these to solve for the coefficients, we get:

α$= \frac{R_{wr}}{R_w}$

β$= \frac{G_{wr}}{G_w}$

γ$= \frac{B_{wr}}{B_w}$

This law holds for the color space of the cones, although it has been proven applicable to other color spaces.

== Evaluation/effectiveness of the law ==
Many studies have been conducted to study the precision and applicability of the law. Most studies conclude that the law is a general approximation that cannot take into account all of the specificity needed to get a precise answer; different studies and their results will be summarized below. Wirth, in research done from 1900 to 1903, demonstrated through his studies that the law can be considered “nearly valid for reacting lights that are not too weak”. The theory on sensitivity and reacting light was also evaluated and emphasized by Wright in 1934 studies, where he stated, “Now suppose R’, G’, and B’ are hypothetical stimuli that produce responses along A, B, and C,… three independent set of fibers to the brain. Then a reduction in sensitivity produced by light adaptation will, for a test colour that stimulates A alone, produce an intensity depression of R’ but no colour change; similarly if B or C are stimulated alone.”

The von Kries coefficient law has also been known to be an inaccurate predictor of asymmetric matching experiments. However, this might be seen as a way to moderate color constancy - models display color constancy only as far as the von Kries coefficient law displays color constancy. Therefore, any discrepancies in calculations are due to the visual system behaving in accordance with newer models

Further research by Brian Wandell on Wassof's findings revealed that when objects analyzed by the coefficient law are in the same context, the rates of cone absorption as realized by the law match up with experimental values. However, when the two objects are seen under different illuminants, the cone absorptions do not correlate with the true values. Within each context the observer uses the pattern of cone absorption to infer color appearance, probably by comparing the relative cone absorption rates. Color appearance is an interpretation of the physical properties of the objects in the image.

== Prevalence ==
=== Applications ===
Despite the various inconsistencies seen in the von Kries coefficient law, the law is widely used in many color and vision applications and papers. For example, many chromatic adaptation platforms (CATs) are based on the von Kries coefficient law. It has been used in many applications, especially in many psychophysical research. It has been used in applications ranging from psychophysical work by researchers such as Takasari, Judd, and Pearson; it has also been used in electrophysiological experiments.

Alternatives to the von Kries coefficient law, while they have been brought up and studied (for example, Jameson and Hurvich's induced opponent response chromatic adaptation theory), have never reached the level of prevalence found by the simplicity of the von Kries coefficient law.

Nearly all commercial digital cameras use the von Kries coefficient law to model the variation and chromatic adaptation.

=== von Kries transform ===
One of the derivations of the von Kries coefficient law is the von Kries transform, a chromatic adaptation method that is sometimes used in camera image processing. Using the coefficient law, cone responses $c'$ from two radiant spectra can be matched by appropriate choice of diagonal adaptation matrices D_{1} and D_{2}:

$$c'=D_1\,S^T\,f_1 = D_2\,S^T\,f_2$$

where $S$ is the cone sensitivity matrix and $f$ is the spectrum of the conditioning stimulus. This leads to the von Kries transform for chromatic adaptation in LMS color space (responses of long-, medium-, and short-wavelength cone response space):

$$D = D_1^{-1} D_2=\begin{bmatrix} L_2/L_1 & 0 & 0 \\ 0 & M_2/M_1 & 0 \\ 0 & 0 & S_2/S_1 \end{bmatrix}$$
