= ICAM (color appearance model) =

iCAM, short for image color appearance model, is developed by Mark D. Fairchild and Garrett M. Johnson and initially published in 2002 at the IS&T/SID 10th Color Imaging Conference in Scottsdale, Arizona. As of May 2019, the latest version appears to be iCAM06, a 2006 revision that expanded tone mapping capacities for HDR.

== Requirements ==
It has been recognized that there are significant aspects of color appearance phenomena that are not described well, if at all, by models such as CIECAM97s or CIECAM02. The requirements for such a model include:

- Simple implementation for images
- Spatially localized adaptation and tone mapping for high-dynamic-range images
- Other spatial phenomena
- Accurate color appearance
- Scales for gamut mapping and other image editing procedures
- Spatial filtering for visibility of artifacts
- Color difference metrics for image quality assessment

As of 2013, iCAM06 is capable of reaching all of the goals above. Temporal effects have been noted as a future direction of development according to Fairchild's lecture slides.

== Characteristics of iCAM ==
iCAM can accurately predict the results of an observation under different conditions. It can describe the aspects of color appearance phenomena and metrics of color differences, and it is used to obtain color gamut mapping calculations based on the perception of the human eye. iCAM uses image's spatial aspects of vision and adapts stimulus to become a low-passing image.
