= Media Standard Print =

German standard for print

Media Standard Print is a publication of the Bundesverband Druck und Medien (BVDM) (German Printing and Media Industries Federation, Berlin), available on its website. The publication contains instructions on how to produce data and proofs that are to be sent to a printer. It is based on ProcessStandard Offset and therefore on the ISO standards 12647 and 15930. It serves as the foundation for cooperation between customer, prepress service provider and printer during media production, covering file format, colour spaces, printing conditions, workflows, means of proofing, standards, and black composition.

Only those printing conditions adopted in ISO 12647-2 to -6 are permitted. In terms of data formats, only PDF files (ideally PDF/X-4 or PDF/X-1a) and TIFFs should be used for the delivery of individual images. Open files should be avoided. ICC profiles and the reference printing condition must be embedded with media neutral data or made available to the recipient.

A Media Standard Print conforming contract proof must contain the FOGRA media wedge, the measurement record, the colour profiles used, the time and date of the proof. The print of the media wedge should be measured. Colour measurement should be carried out in accordance with ISO 13655:2009 in measurement mode M1 on a white backing and the visual evaluation of the proof including its comparison with printed copies should be under a standard illuminant in accordance with ISO 3664:2009 (confirmed 2015).

Media Standard Print proposes three possible workflows: a 'media neutral' one, a 'media specific' one and a 'classic media specific' one. The media neutral workflow (RGB colours, Lab colours and so on; PDF/X-4) offers advantages if it has not yet been decided what press will be used for printing, allowing the black composition to be adjusted. The disadvantage of the ‘media neutral’ workflow is a degree of rendering uncertainty, since the gamut mapping should be carried out using the unstandardized perceptual rendering intent.

== Important changes in the 2016 edition ==
The eighth German edition was published in August 2016 and supersedes the 2010 edition. Media Standard Print 2016 – the English translation of the new German edition – was published in February 2017. Inter alia, it covers the switch to the new standard printing conditions for offset printing that were defined in 2013 and that for the first time take the effect of optical brighteners into account and so improve production quality. It therefore lists old printing conditions or ones that are valid for the time being in parallel with the new ones. Part 7 (Proofs) of the ISO 12647 standard is treated in greater detail than previously and in October 2016 use of the CIEDE2000 colour difference formula was made obligatory for proofs. The change in colour difference formula, which offers a better description of the visual uniformity of the colour space, also changes the previous figures for aim values and tolerances. However, in practice, the room for manoeuvre remains largely the same.

The description of the standard printing conditions for the various printing methods of offset, gravure, flexo, newspaper and screen has been expanded through the addition of five typical digital printing applications.

Furthermore, Media Standard Print refers to ISO 15397 and this is the first such reference to a standard that covers the key values for paper-based substrates. The standardized listing and communication of paper parameters had been neglected for many years but the standard adopted in 2014 should now be disseminated more widely and become indispensable for professional communication in printed product planning.

Media Standard print is also being produced in a new format. In response to the current prevalence of mobile end devices the 78 page PDF document has been produced in landscape format in order to fit display screens, whilst internal hypertext links simplify navigation through the document. References to the corresponding chapter of ProcessStandard Offset or its revision published in July 2016 direct the reader to more detailed information.

Media Standard Print 2016 is the first English language translation of the German Medienstandard Druck since 2006. The bvdm is not planning to publish an English translation of the German edition of Process Standard Offset 2012/2016, which is recognized beyond the borders of Germany and Europe. This makes the English language edition of Media Standard Print 2016 all the more important for technical communication, since it refers to the same ISO Standards.

== Additions in the 2018 edition ==
The 2018 edition (substituted the 2016 edition in March, 2018) promptly responds to changes in the ongoing standardization process. For the first time, standards and means for special colour and multi-colour applications are described.

Specifically, the following additions have been made:

- New European Color Initiative (ECI) working colour space (i.e. the eciCMYK CMYK exchange colour space)
- SCTV Tone value (increase) curves for spot colours in accordance with ISO 20654
- CxF/X-4 generation and exchange of spot colour data in accordance with ISO 17972
- Separate 6-B standard printing condition with the PSO SC-B paper v3 (FOGRA54) ECI profile
- New ECI-PSR profiles for publication gravure
- PDF/X for variable digital print content in accordance with ISO 16612-2 PDF/VT and ISO 16613-1 PDF/VCR-1
- Fogra MultiColor MediaWedge
- New values for the white measurement backing and more precise M0 and M1 measurement modes in accordance with the 2017 revision of ISO 13655:2009, because optical brighteners are calling for defined UV-portions in lighting and measuring during high quality production processes
