= Johannes von Kries =

German physiological psychologist

- Born: 6 October 1853; Roggenhausen, Prussia
- Died: 30 December 1928 (aged 75); Freiburg im Breisgau, Baden
- Known for: Von Kries coefficient law Von Kries transform
- Awards: Pour le Mérite (1918)
- Scientific career
- Fields: Physiological psychology

Johannes Adolf von Kries (6 October 1853 – 30 December 1928) was a German physiological psychologist who formulated the modern “duplicity” or “duplexity” theory of vision mediated by rod cells at low light levels and three types of cone cells at higher light levels. He made important contributions in the field of haemodynamics. In addition, von Kries was a significant theorist of the foundations of probability.

== Biography ==
When von Kries was at Freiburg (1880–1924), he was called to succeed Professor Emil Du Bois-Reymond as chair of physiology at the University of Berlin, but he declined.

Von Kries has been called Helmholtz's "greatest German disciple".

== Works ==
- “Über den Druck in den Blutcapillaren der menschlichen Haut”, Arbeiten aus der Physiologischen Anstalt zu Leipzig p 69-80 (1875).
- “Die Zeitdauer einfachster psychischer Vorgänge” with Felix Auerbach. Archiv für Physiologie p 297-378 (1877).
- “Über die Bestimmung des Mitteldruckes durch das Quecksilbermanometer”, Archiv für Physiologie p 419-440 (1878).
- “Beitrag zur Physiologie der Gesichtsempfindungen”, Archiv für Physiologie p 503-524 (1878).
- “Über angeborene Farbenblindheit” with Küster, Archiv für Physiologie p 513-524 (1879).
- “Über die Abhängigkeit der Reactionszeiten vom Ort des Reizes” with Winf. S. Hall, Archiv für Physiologie Suppl.: 1–10 (1879).
- “Untersuchungen zur Mechanik des quergestreiften Muskels”, Archiv für Physiologie p 348-374 (1880).
- “Über die Summirung untermaximaler Reize in Muskeln und Nerven” with Henry Sewall, Archiv für Physiologie p 66-77 (1881).
- “Über die Mischung von Spectralfarben” with Max Frey, Archiv für Physiologie p 336-353 (1881).
- Die Gesichtsempfindungen und ihre Analyse (1882).
- “Bemerkungen zu der Arbeit von Aubert ‘die Helligkeit des Schwarz und Weiss’”, Archiv für die gesammte Physiologie des Menschen und der Thiere 33: 248–250 (1884).
- “Ueber die Abhängigkeit der Erregungs-Vorgänge von dem zeitlichen Verlaufe der zur Reizung dienenden Elektricitäts-Bewegungen”, Archiv für Physiologie p 337-372 (1884).
- “Untersuchungen zur Mechanik des quergestreiften Muskels: Zweite Abhandlung”, Archiv für Physiologie p 67-78 (1885).
- “Ueber einen Fundamentalsatz aus der Theorie der Gesichtsempfindungen” with Brauneck, Archiv für Physiologie p 79-84 (1885).
- “Notiz über das Federrheonom”, Archiv für Physiologie p 85 (1885).
- Principien der Wahrscheinlichkeitsrechnung, eine logische Untersuchung (1886).
- “Zur Kenntniss der willkürlichen Muskelthätigkeit”, Archiv für Physiologie Suppl.: 1–16 (1886).
- “Zur Theorie der Gesichtsempfindungen”, Archiv für Physiologie p 113-119 (1887).
- “Ueber ein neues Verfahren zur Beobachtung der Wellenbewegung des Blutes”, Archiv für Physiologie p 254-284 (1887).
- “Ein Verfahren zur quantitativen Auswerthung der Pulswelle“, Berliner Klinische Wochenschrift 24: 589–591 (1887).
- “Entgegnung an Herrn E. Hering”, Archiv für die gesammte Physiologie des Menschen und der Thiere 41: 389–396 (1887).
- “Nochmalige Bemerkung zur Theorie der Gesichtsempfindungen”, Archiv für Physiologie p 380-388 (1888).
- “Untersuchungen zur Mechanik des quergestreiften Muskels, Dritte Mittheilung: Ueber den zeitlichen Verlauf summirter Zuckungen”, Archiv für Physiologie p 537-548 (1888).
- review of A. König's “Über den Helligkeitswert der Spektralfarben bei verschiedener absoluter Intensität”, Zeitschrift für Psychologie und Physiologie der Sinnesorgane 4: 422–424 (1893).
- “Ueber die anomalen trichromatischen Farbensysteme”, Zeitschrift für Psychologie und Physiologie der Sinnesorgane 19: 63–69 (1899).
- “Über das Erkennen der Schallrichtung”, Zeitschrift für Psychologie und Physiologie der Sinnesorgane 1: 235–251 (1890).
- “Nachtrag zu der Abhandlung ‘Über das Erkennen der Schallrichtung’”, Zeitschrift für Psychologie und Physiologie der Sinnesorgane 1: 488 (1890).
- Beiträge zur Psychologie und Physiologie der Sinnesorgane: Hermann von Helmholtz als Festgruss zu seinem 70. Geburtstag with Theodor Wilhelm & alii, edited by Arthur König (1891).
- “Untersuchungen zur Mechanik der quergestreiften Muskeln”, Archiv für Physiologie p 1-21 (1892).
- “Über das absolute Gehör”, Zeitschrift für Psychologie und Physiologie der Sinnesorgane 3: 257–279 (1892).
- review of A. König's “Über den Helligkeitswert der Spektralfarben bei verschiedener absoluter Intensität”, Zeitschrift für Psychologie und Physiologie der Sinnesorgane 4: 422–424 (1893).
- “Ueber einige Beobachtungen mit dem Capillarelektrometer”, Archiv für Physiologie p 130-141 (1895).
- “Untersuchungen zur Mechanik des quergestreiften Muskels: Fünfte Mittheilung”, Archiv für Physiologie p 142-153 (1895).
- “Ueber den Einfluss der Adaption auf Licht- und Farbenempfindung und über die Funktion der Stäbchen”, Berichte über die Naturforschende Gesellschaft zu Freiburg i. B. 9: 61–70 (1895).
- “Über die Natur gewisser mit den psychischen Vorgängen verknüpfter Gehirnzustände”, Zeitschrift für Psychologie und Physiologie der Sinnesorgane 8: 1–33 (1895).
- “Über den Einfluß von Lichtstärke und Adaptation auf das Sehen des Dichromaten (Grünblinden)” with W. Nagel, Zeitschrift für Psychologie und Physiologie der Sinnesorgane 12: 1–38 (1896).
- “Über die Wirkung kurzdauernder Lichtreize auf das Sehorgan”, Zeitschrift für Psychologie und Physiologie der Sinnesorgane 12: 81–101 (1896).
- “Über die Farbenblindheit der Netzhautperipherie”, Zeitschrift für Psychologie und Physiologie der Sinnesorgane 15: 247–279 (1897).
- “Über Farbensysteme. Zeitschrift für Psychologie und Physiologie der Sinnesorgane 13: 241–324 (1897). Correction published in Zeitschrift für Psychologie und Physiologie der Sinnesorgane 13: 473 (1897).
- “Über die absolute Empfindlichkeit der verschiedenen Netzhautteile im dunkeladaptierten Auge”, Zeitschrift für Psychologie und Physiologie der Sinnesorgane 15: 327–351 (1897).
- review of A. König's “Quantitative Bestimmungen an komplementären Spektralfarben”, Zeitschrift für Psychologie und Physiologie der Sinnesorgane 16: 219–220 (1898).
- “Ueber die anomalen trichromatischen Farbensysteme”, Zeitschrift für Psychologie und Physiologie der Sinnesorgane 19: 63–69 (1899).
- “Kritische Bemerkungen zur Farbentheorie”, Zeitschrift für Psychologie und Physiologie der Sinnesorgane 19: 175–191 (1899).
- “Weitere Mittheilungen über die functionelle Sonderstellung des Netzhautcentrums with W. A. Nagel, Zeitschrift für Psychologie und Physiologie der Sinnesorgane 23: 161–186 (1900).
- “Ueber die Abhängigkeit der Dämmerungswerthe vom Adaptionsgrade”, Zeitschrift für Psychologie und Physiologie der Sinnesorgane 25: 225–238 (1901).
- “Ueber die Wirkung kurzdauernder Reize auf das Sehorgan”, Zeitschrift für Psychologie und Physiologie der Sinnesorgane 25: 239–243 (1901).
- “Ueber eine Art polyrhythmischer Herzthätigkeit”, Archiv für Physiologie, no. 5/6: 477–491 (1902).
- “Ueber die im Netzhautcentrum fehlende Nachbilderscheinung und über die diesen Gegenstand betreffenden Arbeiten von C. Hess”, Zeitschrift für Psychologie und Physiologie der Sinnesorgane 29: 81–98 (1902).
- “Über die Wahrnehmung des Flimmerns durch normale und durch total farbenblinde Personen”, Zeitschrift für Psychologie und Physiologie der Sinnesorgane 32: 113–117 (1903).
- review of F. Hillebrand's “Theorie der scheinbaren Größe bei binokularem Sehen”, Zeitschrift für Psychologie und Physiologie der Sinnesorgane 33: 366–368 (1903).
- 3. “Gesichtsempfindungen”, XII. “Übersicht der Tatsachen, Ergebnisse für die theoretische Auffassung des Sehorgans: Zonentheorie”, Handbuch der Physiologie des Menschen, Dritter Band: Physiologie der Sinne (edited by Willibald Nagel) pp. 269–274 (1905).
- “Über die zur Erregung des Sehorgans erforderlichen Energiemengen: Nach Beobachtungen von Herrn Dr. Eyster mitgeteilt”, Zeitschrift für Sinnesphysiologie 41: 373–394 (1907).
- “Über ein für das physiologische Praktikum geeignetes Verfahren zur Mischung reiner Lichter”, Zeitschrift für Sinnesphysiologie 43: 58–68 (1909).
- “Über das Binokularsehen exzentrischer Netzhautteile”, Zeitschrift für Sinnesphysiologie 44: 165–181 (1910).
- “Über die Bedeutung der Bahnbreite für die Reizleitung im Herzen”, Skandinavisches Archiv für Physiologie 29: 84–96 (1913).
- “Messende Versuche über die Funktionsstellung im Sehorgan. (Nach Beobachtungen von Herrn Dr. Ludwig Schmidt)”, Zeitschrift für Sinnesphysiologie 49: 297–315 (1916).
- “Physiologische Bemerkungen zu Ostwalds Farbenfibel”, Zeitschrift für Sinnesphysiologie 50: 117–136 (1919).
- “Über einen Fall von einseitiger angeborener Deuteranomalie (Grünschwäche)”, Zeitschrift für Sinnesphysiologie 50: 137–152 (1919).
- Allgemeine sinnesphysiologie (1923).
- Immanuel Kant und seine Bedeutung für die Naturforschung der Gegenwart (1924).
- “Über Empfindungsmannigfaltigkeiten und ihre geometrische Darstellung”, Zeitschrift für Sinnesphysiologie 56: 281–317 (1925).
- Wer ist musikalisch? Gedanken zur Psychologie der Tonkunst (1926).

== See also ==
- Color balance
