= European Color Initiative =

Expert group for digital color data

The European Color Initiative (ECI) is an expert group that is concerned with media-neutral reproduction of color data in digital publication systems. It was formed in June 1996 by German publishers Bauer, Burda, Gruner + Jahr and Springer in Hamburg.

ECI offers several ICC profiles to be downloaded for free from their website to improve color management across publishing houses. This includes their very own ECI-RGB as recommended working color space on screen and ECI-CMYK (Fogra 53) for printing processes. They also offer test charts for device characterization.

== RGB ==
The ECI-RGB color space, sometimes written ECI RGB or eciRGB, is a standardized RGB color space using the D50 white point (CIE xy: 0.34567, 0.35850) and NTSC color primaries: red 0.67, 0.33; green 0.21, 0.71; blue 0.14, 0.08. Its wide gamut covers most mass printing technologies and all current display technologies. Version 1 was released in 1999 and a mostly compatible, updated version 2 was published in April 2007, which was later republished as international standard ISO 22028-4:2012.

== CMYK ==
The ECI-CMYK color space, sometimes written ECI CMYK or eciCMYK, is a standardized CMYK color space for graphic data exchange in the print industry. It is equivalent to Fogra 53, often spelt FOGRA53, and is intended to overcome limitations of and thereby replace the ISO Coated CMYK exchange color space (version 2 = Fogra 39, version 3 = Fogra 51).

== See also ==
- Media Standard Print
- ICC International Color Consortium
- Fogra, Graphic Technology Research Association
- IDEAlliance, International Digital Enterprise Alliance
- WAN-IFRA, World Association of Newspapers and News Publishers
- ROMM RGB (ISO 22028-2), reference output medium metric RGB colour image encoding, also known as Kodak ProPhoto RGB
- RIMM RGB (ISO 22028-3), reference input medium metric RGB colour image encoding
- ISO 12640-1:1997, Prepress digital data exchange — Part 1: CMYK standard colour image data (CMYK/SCID)
- ISO 12647-2:2013 and ISO/AWI 12647-2 (under development), Process control for the production of half-tone colour separations, proof and production prints — Part 2: Offset lithographic processes for "ISO Coated"
- ISO 16760:2014, Preparation and visualization of RGB images to be used in RGB-based graphics arts workflow
- ISO 19302:2018, Colour conformity of printing workflows
