= CIECAM02 =

Color appearance model

Observing field model. Not drawn to scale.

In colorimetry, CIECAM02 is the color appearance model published in 2002 by the International Commission on Illumination (CIE) Technical Committee 8-01 (Color Appearance Modelling for Color Management Systems) and the successor of CIECAM97s. It has since been superseded by CIECAM16.

The two major parts of the model are its chromatic adaptation transform, CIECAT02, and its equations for calculating mathematical correlates for the six technically defined dimensions of color appearance: brightness (luminance), lightness, colorfulness, chroma, saturation, and hue.

Brightness is the subjective appearance of how bright an object appears given its surroundings and how it is illuminated. Lightness is the subjective appearance of how light a color appears to be. Colorfulness is the degree of difference between a color and gray. Chroma is the colorfulness relative to the brightness of another color that appears white under similar viewing conditions. This allows for the fact that a surface of a given chroma displays increasing colorfulness as the level of illumination increases. Saturation is the colorfulness of a color relative to its own brightness. Hue is the degree to which a stimulus can be described as similar to or different from stimuli that are described as red, green, blue, and yellow, the so-called unique hues. The colors that make up an object’s appearance are best described in terms of lightness and chroma when talking about the colors that make up the object’s surface, and in terms of brightness, saturation and colorfulness when talking about the light that is emitted by or reflected off the object.

CIECAM02 takes for its input the tristimulus values of the stimulus, the tristimulus values of an adapting white point, adapting background, and surround luminance information, and whether or not observers are discounting the illuminant (color constancy is in effect). The model can be used to predict these appearance attributes or, with forward and reverse implementations for distinct viewing conditions, to compute corresponding colors.

The Windows Color System introduced in Windows Vista uses Canon's Kyuanos (キュアノス) technology for mapping image gamuts between output devices, which in turn uses CIECAM02 for color matching.

== Viewing conditions ==
The inner circle is the stimulus, from which the tristimulus values should be measured in CIE XYZ using the 2° standard observer. The intermediate circle is the proximal field, extending out another 2°. The outer circle is the background, reaching out to 10°, from which the relative luminance (Y_{b}) need be measured. If the proximal field is the same color as the background, the background is considered to be adjacent to the stimulus. Beyond the circles which comprise the display field (display area, viewing area) is the surround field (or peripheral area), which can be considered to be the entire room. The totality of the proximal field, background, and surround is called the adapting field (the field of view that supports adaptation—extends to the limit of vision).

When referring to the literature, it is also useful to be aware of the difference between the terms adopted white point (the computational white point) and the adapted white point (the observer white point). The distinction may be important in mixed mode illumination, where psychophysical phenomena come into play. This is a subject of research.

== Parameter decision table ==
CIECAM02 defines three surround(ing)s – average, dim, and dark – with associated parameters defined here for reference in the rest of this article:

Surround condition	Surround ratio	F	c	N_{c}	Application
Average	S_{R} > 0.15	1.0	0.69	1.0	Viewing surface colors
Dim	0 < S_{R} < 0.15	0.9	0.59	0.9	Viewing television
Dark	S_{R} = 0	0.8	0.525	0.8	Using a projector in a dark room

- S_{R} = L_{sw} / L_{dw}: ratio of the absolute luminance of the reference white (white point) measured in the surround field to the display area. The 0.2 coefficient derives from the "gray world" assumption (~18%–20% reflectivity). It tests whether the surround luminance is darker or brighter than medium gray.
- F: factor determining degree of adaptation
- c: impact of surrounding
- N_{c}: chromatic induction factor

For intermediate conditions, these values can be linearly interpolated.

The absolute luminance of the adapting field, which is a quantity that will be needed later, should be measured with a photometer. If one is not available, it can be calculated using a reference white:

$$L_A = \frac{E_w}{\pi} \frac{Y_b}{Y_w} = \frac{L_W Y_b}{Y_w}$$

where:

- Y_{b} is the relative luminance of background
- E_{w} = πL_{W} is the illuminance of the reference white in lux
- L_{W} is the absolute luminance of the reference white in cd/m^{2}
- Y_{w} is the relative luminance of the reference white in the adapting field

If unknown, the adapting field can be assumed to have average reflectance ("gray world" assumption):

$$L_A = L_W / 5$$

Note: Care should be taken not to confuse L_{W}, the absolute luminance of the reference white in cd/m^{2}, and L_{w} the red cone response in the LMS color space.

== Chromatic adaptation ==
=== Summary ===
1. Convert to the "spectrally sharpened" CAT02 LMS space to prepare for adaptation. Spectral sharpening is the transformation of the tristimulus values into new values that would have resulted from a sharper, more concentrated set of spectral sensitivities. It is argued that this aids color constancy, especially in the blue region. (Compare Finlayson et al. 94, Spectral Sharpening:Sensor Transformations for Improved Color Constancy)
2. Perform chromatic adaptation using CAT02 (also known as the "modified CMCCAT2000 transform").
3. Convert to an LMS space closer to the cone fundamentals. It is argued that predicting perceptual attribute correlates is best done in such spaces.
4. Perform post-adaptation cone response compression.

=== CAT02 ===
Given a set of tristimulus values in XYZ, the corresponding LMS values can be determined by the M_{CAT02} transformation matrix (calculated using the CIE 1931 2° standard colorimetric observer). The sample color in the test illuminant is:

$$\begin{bmatrix}
L\\
M\\
S
\end{bmatrix}
=
\mathbf{M}_\mathit{CAT02}
\begin{bmatrix}
X\\
Y\\
Z
\end{bmatrix},\quad
\mathbf{M}_\mathit{CAT02}
=
\begin{bmatrix}
\;\;\,0.7328 & 0.4296 & -0.1624\\
-0.7036 & 1.6975 &  \;\;\,0.0061\\
\;\;\,0.0030 & 0.0136 &  \;\;\,0.9834
\end{bmatrix}$$.

Once in LMS, the white point can be adapted to the desired degree by choosing the parameter D. For the general CAT02, the corresponding color in the reference illuminant is:

$$\begin{align}
L_c &= \Big(\frac{Y_w L_{wr}}{Y_{wr} L_w} D + 1-D\Big)L\\
M_c &=\Big(\frac{Y_w M_{wr}}{Y_{wr} M_w} D + 1-D\Big)M\\
S_c &= \Big(\frac{Y_w S_{wr}}{Y_{wr} S_w} D + 1-D\Big)S\\
\end{align}$$

where the Y_{w} / Y_{wr} factor accounts for the two illuminants having the same chromaticity but different reference whites. The subscripts indicate the cone response for white under the test (w) and reference illuminant (wr). The degree of adaptation (discounting) D can be set to zero for no adaptation (stimulus is considered self-luminous) and unity for complete adaptation (color constancy). In practice, it ranges from 0.65 to 1.0, as can be seen from the diagram. Intermediate values can be calculated by:

$$D = F \left( 1 - \textstyle{\frac{1}{3.6}} e^{-(L_A + 42) / 92} \right)$$

where surround F is as defined above and L_{A} is the adapting field luminance in cd/m^{2}.

log-log plot of F_{L} vs. L_{A} (L_{A} ranges from 10^{−4} to 10^{4}, F_{L} ranges from 10^{−4} to 10). The cube root approximation of F_{L} is 0.1715L_{A}^{1/3}

In CIECAM02, the reference illuminant has equal energy L_{wr} = M_{wr} = S_{wr} = 100) and the reference white is the perfect reflecting diffuser (i.e., unity reflectance, and Y_{wr} = 100) hence:

$$\begin{align}
L_c &= \Big(\frac{Y_w}{L_w} D + 1-D\Big)L\\
M_c &=\Big(\frac{Y_w}{M_w} D + 1-D\Big)M\\
S_c &= \Big(\frac{Y_w}{S_w} D + 1-D\Big)S\\
\end{align}$$

Furthermore, if the reference white in both illuminants have the Y tristimulus value (Y_{wr} = Y_{w}) then:

$$\begin{align}
L_c &= \Big(\frac{L_{wr}}{L_w} D + 1-D\Big)L\\
M_c &=\Big(\frac{M_{wr}}{M_w} D + 1-D\Big)M\\
S_c &= \Big(\frac{S_{wr}}{S_w} D + 1-D\Big)S\\
\end{align}$$

=== Post-adaptation ===
After adaptation, the cone responses are converted to the Hunt–Pointer–Estévez space by going to XYZ and back:

$$\begin{bmatrix}
L' \\
M' \\
S'
\end{bmatrix}
=
\mathbf{M}_H
\begin{bmatrix}
X_c \\
Y_c \\
Z_c
\end{bmatrix}
=
\mathbf{M}_H
\mathbf{M}_{CAT02}^{-1}
\begin{bmatrix}
L_c \\
M_c \\
S_c
\end{bmatrix}$$

$$\mathbf{M}_H
=
\begin{bmatrix}
\;\;\,0.38971 & 0.68898 & -0.07868 \\
-0.22981 & 1.18340 &  \;\;\,0.04641 \\
\;\;\,0.00000 & 0.00000 &  \;\;\,1.00000
\end{bmatrix}$$

log L′_{a} vs. log L′ for L_{A} = 200 (F_{L} = 1)

Note that the matrix above, which was inherited from CIECAM97s, has the unfortunate property that since 0.38971 + 0.68898 – 0.07868 = 1.00001, 1⃗ ≠ M_{H}1⃗ and that consequently gray has non-zero chroma, an issue which CAM16 aims to address.

Finally, the response is compressed based on the generalized Michaelis–Menten equation (as depicted aside):

$$k = \frac{1}{5 L_A + 1}$$

$$F_L = \textstyle{\frac{1}{5}} k^4 \left( 5 L_A \right) + \textstyle{\frac{1}{10}} {(1 - k^4)}^2 {\left( 5 L_A \right)}^{1/3}$$

F_{L} is the luminance level adaptation factor.

$$\begin{align}
L'_a &= \frac{400 {\left(F_L L'/100\right)}^{0.42}}{27.13 + {\left(F_L L'/100\right)}^{0.42}} + 0.1 \\
M'_a &= \frac{400 {\left(F_L M'/100\right)}^{0.42}}{27.13 + {\left(F_L M'/100\right)}^{0.42}} + 0.1 \\
S'_a &= \frac{400 {\left(F_L S'/100\right)}^{0.42}}{27.13 + {\left(F_L S'/100\right)}^{0.42}} + 0.1
\end{align}$$

As previously mentioned, if the luminance level of the background is unknown, it can be estimated from the absolute luminance of the white point as L_{A} = L_{W} / 5 using the "medium gray" assumption. (The expression for F_{L} is given in terms of 5L_{A} for convenience.) In photopic conditions, the luminance level adaptation factor (F_{L}) is proportional to the cube root of the luminance of the adapting field (L_{A}). In scotopic conditions, it is proportional to L_{A} (meaning no luminance level adaptation). The photopic threshold is roughly L_{W} = 1 (see F_{L}–L_{A} graph above).

== Appearance correlates ==
CIECAM02 defines correlates for yellow-blue, red-green, brightness, and colorfulness. Let us make some preliminary definitions.

$$\begin{align}
C_1 &= L^\prime_a - M^\prime_a \\
C_2 &= M^\prime_a - S^\prime_a \\
C_3 &= S^\prime_a - L^\prime_a
\end{align}$$

The correlate for red–green (a) is the magnitude of the departure of C_{1} from the criterion for unique yellow (C_{1} = C_{2} / 11), and the correlate for yellow–blue (b) is based on the mean of the magnitude of the departures of C_{1} from unique red (C_{1} = C_{2}) and unique green (C_{1} = C_{3}).

$$\begin{align}
a &= C_1 - \textstyle{\frac{1}{11}}C_2
&= L^\prime_a - \textstyle{\frac{12}{11}} M^\prime_a + \textstyle{\frac{1}{11}} S^\prime_a \\
b &= \textstyle{\frac{1}{2}} \left( C_2 - C_1 + C_1 - C_3 \right) / 4.5
&= \textstyle{\frac{1}{9}} \left( L^\prime_a + M^\prime_a - 2S^\prime_a \right)
\end{align}$$

The 4.5 factor accounts for the fact that there are fewer cones at shorter wavelengths (the eye is less sensitive to blue). The order of the terms is such that b is positive for yellowish colors (rather than blueish).

The hue angle (h) can be found by converting the rectangular coordinate (a, b) into polar coordinates:

$$h = \angle (a, b) = \operatorname{atan2}(b, a),\ (0 \le h < 360^\circ)$$

To calculate the eccentricity (e_{t}) and hue composition (H), determine which quadrant the hue is in with the aid of the following table. Choose i such that h_{i} ≤ h′ < h_{i+1}, where h′ = h if h > h_{1} and h′ = h + 360° otherwise.

	Red	Yellow	Green	Blue	Red
i	1	2	3	4	5
h_{i}	20.14	90.00	164.25	237.53	380.14
e_{i}	0.8	0.7	1.0	1.2	0.8
H_{i}	0.0	100.0	200.0	300.0	400.0

$$\begin{align}
H &= H_i + \frac{100 (h^\prime - h_i) / e_i}{(h^\prime - h_i) / e_i + (h_{i+1} - h^\prime) / e_{i+1}} \\
e_t &= \textstyle{\frac{1}{4}} \left[ \cos\left( \textstyle{\frac{\pi}{180}}h + 2\right) + 3.8 \right]
\end{align}$$

(This is not exactly the same as the eccentricity factor given in the table.)

Calculate the achromatic response A:

$$A = (2 L^\prime_a + M^\prime_a + \textstyle{\frac{1}{20}} S^\prime_a - 0.305) N_{bb}$$

where

$$\begin{align}
&N_{bb} = N_{cb} = 0.725 n^{-0.2} \\
&n = Y_b / Y_w
\end{align}$$.

The correlate of lightness is

$$J = 100 \left( A / A_w \right)^{c z}$$

where c is the impact of surround (see above), and

$$z = 1.48 + \sqrt{n}$$.

The correlate of brightness is

$$Q = \left(4 / c \right) \sqrt{\textstyle{\frac{1}{100}} J} \left(A_w + 4\right) F_L^{1/4}$$.

Then calculate a temporary quantity t.

$$t = \frac{ \textstyle{\frac{50\,000}{13}} N_c N_{cb} e_t \sqrt{a^2+b^2} }
{ L_a^\prime + M_a^\prime + \textstyle{\frac{21}{20}} S_a^\prime }$$

The correlate of chroma is

$$C = t^{0.9} \sqrt {\textstyle{\frac{1}{100}} J} (1.64 - 0.29^n)^{0.73}$$.

The correlate of colorfulness is

$$M = C \cdot F_L^{1/4}$$.

The correlate of saturation is

$$s = 100 \sqrt {M / Q}$$.

== Color spaces ==
The appearance correlates of CIECAM02, J, a, and b, form a uniform color space that can be used to calculate color differences, as long as a viewing condition is fixed. A more commonly used derivative is the CAM02 Uniform Color Space (CAM02-UCS), an extension with tweaks to better match experimental data.

== CIECAM02 as a model of human visual processing ==
Like many color models, CIECAM02 aims to model the human perception of color. The CIECAM02 model has been shown to be a more plausible model of neural activity in the primary visual cortex, compared to the earlier CIELAB model. Specifically, both its achromatic response A and red-green correlate a can be matched to EMEG activity (entrainment), each with their own characteristic delay.

== See also ==
- CIELAB color space
- CIE 1931 color space
- Color appearance model
