= RGB color spaces =

Any additive color space based on the RGB color model

1931 CIE chromaticity diagram showing some RGB color spaces as defined by their chromaticity triangles

RGB color spaces are a category of additive colorimetric color spaces specifying part of its absolute color space definition using the RGB color model.

RGB color spaces are commonly found describing the mapping of the RGB color model to human perceivable color, but some RGB color spaces use imaginary (non-real-world) primaries and thus can not be displayed directly.

Like any color space, while the specifications in this category use the RGB color model to describe their space, it is not mandatory to use that model to signal pixel color values. Broadcast TV color spaces like NTSC, PAL, Rec. 709, Rec. 2020 additionally describe a translation from RGB to YCbCr and that is how they are usually signaled for transmission, but an image can be stored as either RGB or YCbCr. This demonstrates using the singular term "RGB color space" can be misleading, since a chosen color space or signaled color can be described by any appropriate color model. However the singular can be seen in specifications where storage signaled as RGB is its intended use.

== Definition ==
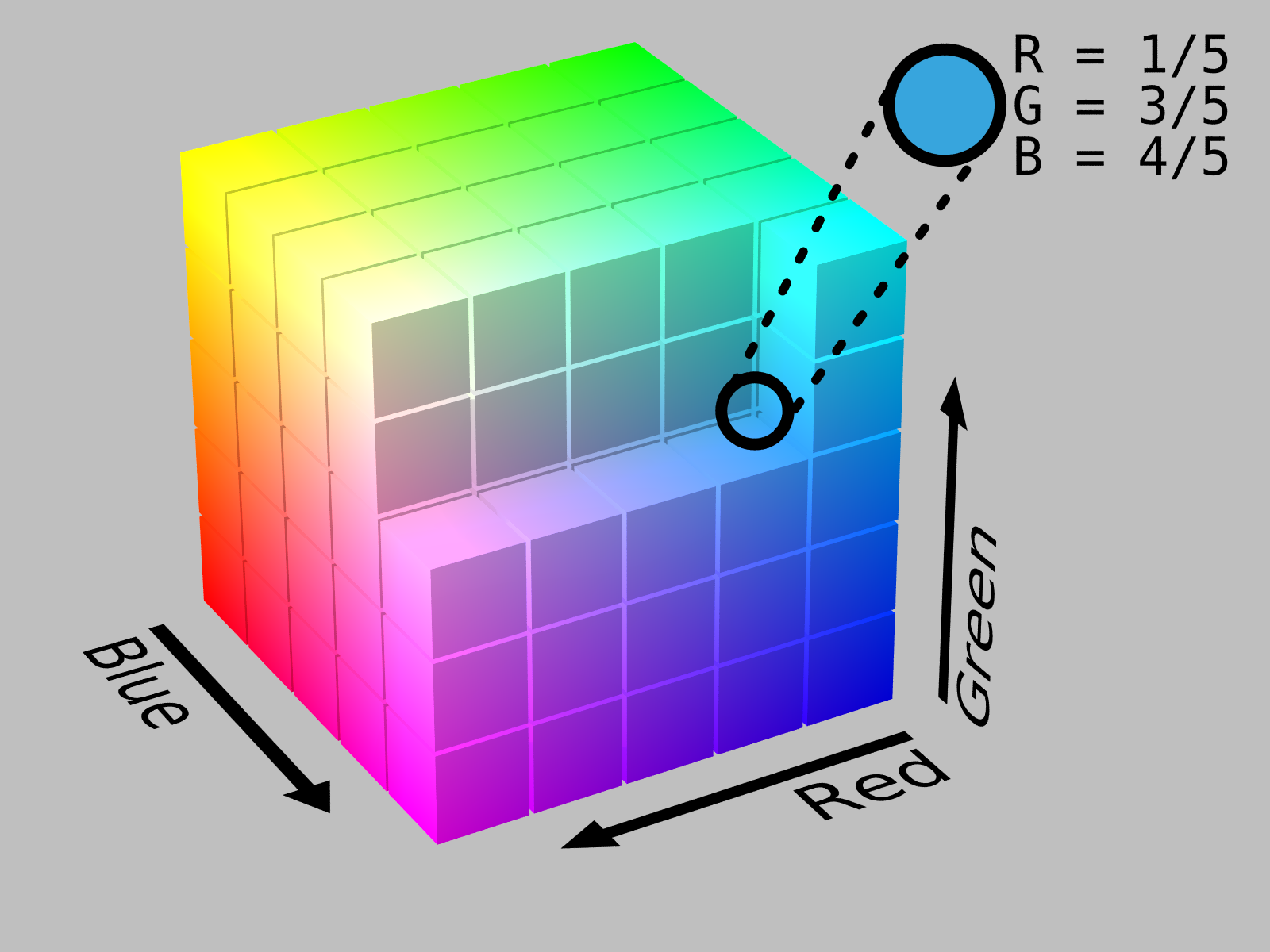
RGB cube

The normal human eye contains three types of color-sensitive cone cells. Each cell is responsive to light of either long, medium, or short wavelengths, which are generally categorized as red, green, and blue. Taken together, the responses of these cone cells are called the Tristimulus values, and the combination of their responses is processed into the psychological effect of color vision.

RGB use in color space definitions employ primaries (and often a white point) based on the RGB color model, to map to real world color. Applying Grassmann's law of light additivity, the range of colors that can be produced are those enclosed within the triangle on the chromaticity diagram defined using the primaries as vertices.

The primary colors are usually mapped to xyY chromaticity coordinates, though the uʹ,vʹ coordinates from the UCS chromaticity diagram may be used. Both xyY and uʹ,vʹ are derived from the CIE 1931 color space, a device independent space also known as XYZ which covers the full gamut of human-perceptible colors visible to the CIE 2° standard observer.

== Applications ==
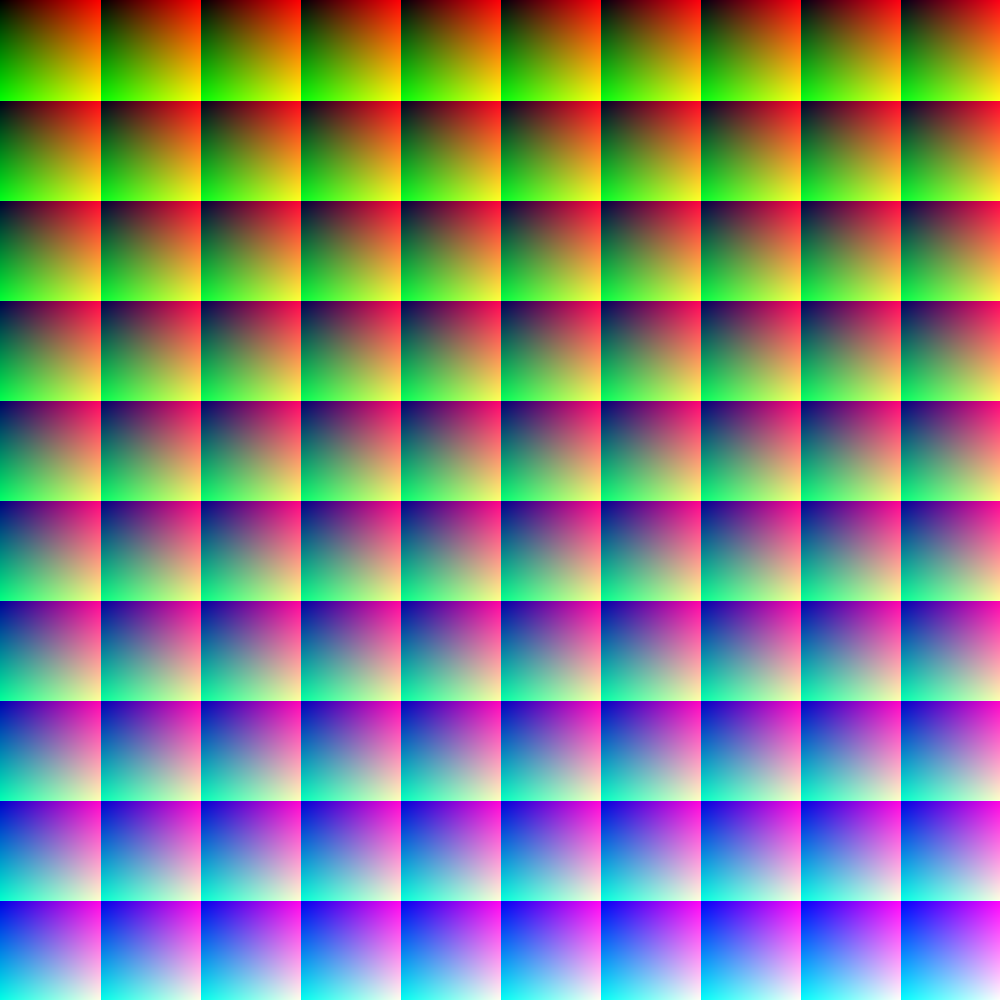
One million colors in RGB space, visible in full-size image

RGB color spaces are well-suited to describing the electronic display of color, such as computer monitors and color television. These devices often reproduce colors using an array of red, green, and blue phosphors agitated by a cathode-ray tube (CRT), or an array of red, green, and blue LCDs lit by a backlight, and are therefore naturally described by an additive color model with RGB primaries.

Early examples of RGB color spaces came with the adoption of the NTSC color television standard in 1953 across North America, followed by PAL and SECAM covering the rest of the world. These early RGB spaces were defined in part by the phosphor used by CRTs in use at the time, and the gamma of the electron beam. While these color spaces reproduced the intended colors using additive red, green, and blue primaries, the broadcast signal itself was encoded from RGB components to a composite signal such as YIQ, and decoded back by the receiver into RGB signals for display.

HDTV uses the BT.709 color space, later repurposed for computer monitors as sRGB. Both use the same color primaries and white point, but different transfer functions, as HDTV is intended for a dark living room while sRGB is intended for a brighter office environment. The gamut of these spaces is limited, covering only 35.9% of the CIE 1931 gamut. While this allows the use of a limited bit depth without causing color banding, and therefore reduces transmission bandwidth, it also prevents the encoding of deeply saturated colors that might be available in an alternate color spaces. Some RGB color spaces such as Adobe RGB and ProPhoto intended for the creation, rather than transmission, of images are designed with expanded gamuts to address this issue, however this does not mean the larger space has 'more colors". The numerical quantity of colors is related to bit depth and not the size or shape of the gamut. A large space with a low bit depth can be detrimental to the gamut density and result in high $\Delta E$ errors.

More recent color spaces such as Rec. 2020 for UHD-TVs define an extremely large gamut covering 63.3% of the CIE 1931 space. This standard is not currently realizable with current LCD technology, and alternative architectures such as quantum dot or OLED based devices are currently in development.

== Color space specifications employing the RGB color model ==
The following table lists the technical specifications for many RGB color spaces (white point and color primaries require a Rec. 2020 capable display for accurate display - on most devices the results will only be approximate):

Color space	Reference standard	Primary color model	Year	White point	Color primaries						Display gamma	Transfer function parameters				
Color space	Reference standard	Primary color model	Year	White point	Red		Green		Blue		Display gamma	γ	α	β	δ	βδ
Color space	Reference standard	Primary color model	Year	White point	x_{ʀ}	y_{ʀ}	x_{ɢ}	y_{ɢ}	x_{ʙ}	y_{ʙ}	EOTF	γ	a + 1	K_{0}/φ = E_{t}	φ	K_{0}
NTSC-J	Based on NTSC (M)	Y′IQ, YCbCr	1987	D93	0.63	0.34	0.31	0.595	0.155	0.07	Curved					
NTSC, MUSE	SMPTE RP 145 (C), 170M, 240M	Y′IQ, YPbPr, YCbCr	1987	D65	0.63	0.34	0.31	0.595	0.155	0.07	Curved	20/9	1.1115	0.0057	4	0.0228
Apple RGB	(Apple Computer)	RGB		D65	0.625	0.34	0.28	0.595	0.155	0.07	1.8					
PAL / SECAM	EBU 3213-E, BT.470/601 (B/G)	Y′UV, YDbDr, YCbCr	1967	D65	0.64	0.33	0.29	0.60	0.15	0.06	Curved	14/5				
sRGB	IEC 61966-2-1	RGB	1996, 1999	D65	0.64	0.33	0.30	0.60	0.15	0.06	2.2	12/5	1.055	0.0031308	12.92	0.04045
scRGB	IEC 61966-2-2		2003	D65	0.64	0.33	0.30	0.60	0.15	0.06	2.2	12/5	1.055	0.0031308	12.92	0.04045
HDTV	ITU-R BT.709	YCbCr	1999	D65	0.64	0.33	0.30	0.60	0.15	0.06	Curved	20/9	1.099	0.004	4.5	0.018
Adobe RGB	(Adobe)	RGB	1998	D65	0.64	0.33	0.21	0.71	0.15	0.06	2.2	563/256				
M.A.C.	ITU-R BO.650-2	YPbPr	1985	D65	0.67	0.33	0.21	0.71	0.14	0.08	2.8					
NTSC-FCC	ITU-R BT.470/601 (M)	Y′IQ, YCbCr	1953	C	0.67	0.33	0.21	0.71	0.14	0.08	2.2	11/5				
PAL-M	ITU-R BT.470-6	Y′UV, YCbCr	1972	C	0.67	0.33	0.21	0.71	0.14	0.08	Curved	14/5				
eciRGB	ISO 22028-4		2008, 2012	D50	0.67	0.33	0.21	0.71	0.14	0.08	1.8	3	1.16	0.008856	9.033	0.08
DCI-P3	SMPTE RP 431-2	YCbCr	2011	6300	0.68	0.32	0.265	0.69	0.15	0.06	2.6	13/5				
Display P3	SMPTE EG 432-1	RGB	2010	D65	0.68	0.32	0.265	0.69	0.15	0.06	~2.2	12/5	1.055	0.0031308	12.92	0.04045
UHDTV	ITU-R BT.2020, BT.2100	YCbCr	2012, 2016	D65	0.708	0.292	0.170	0.797	0.131	0.046	Curved		1.0993	0.018054	4.5	0.081243
Wide Gamut	(Adobe)	RGB		D50	0.7347	0.2653	0.1152	0.8264	0.1566	0.0177	2.2	563/256				
RIMM	ISO 22028-3		2006, 2012	D50	0.7347	0.2653	0.1596	0.8404	0.0366	0.0001	2.222	20/9	1.099	0.0018	5.5	0.099
ProPhoto (ROMM)	ISO 22028-2		2006, 2013	D50	0.734699	0.265301	0.159597	0.840403	0.036598	0.000105	1.8	9/5	1	0.001953125	16	0.031248
CIE RGB	CIE 1931 color space		1931	E	0.73474284	0.26525716	0.27377903	0.7174777	0.16655563	0.00891073						
CIE XYZ	CIE 1931 color space		1931	E	1	0	0	1	0	0		1				

The CIE 1931 color space standard defines both the CIE RGB space, which is a color space with monochromatic primaries, and the CIE XYZ color space, which is functionally similar to a linear RGB color space, however the primaries are not physically realizable, thus are not described as red, green, and blue.

M.A.C. is not to be confused with MacOS. Here, M.A.C.refers to Multiplexed Analogue Components.

== See also ==
- CIELUV color space
- Web colors
- RGB color model
- RGBA color model
