= White point =

Value in color space that defines the color 'white' for capture and reproduction

A white point (often referred to as reference white or target white in technical documents) is a set of tristimulus values or chromaticity coordinates that serve to define the color "white" in image capture, encoding, or reproduction. Depending on the application, different definitions of white are needed to give acceptable results. For example, photographs taken indoors may be lit by incandescent lights, which are relatively orange compared to daylight. Defining "white" as daylight will give unacceptable results when attempting to color-correct a photograph taken with incandescent lighting.

== Illuminants ==
Diagram of the CIE 1931 color space that shows the Rec. 2020 (UHDTV) color space in the outer triangle and Rec. 709 (HDTV) color space in the inner triangle. Both Rec. 2020 and Rec. 709 use Illuminant D65 for the white point.

An illuminant is characterized by its relative spectral power distribution (SPD). The white point of an illuminant is the chromaticity of a white object under the illuminant, and can be specified by chromaticity coordinates, such as the x, y coordinates on the CIE 1931 chromaticity diagram (hence the use of the relative SPD and not the absolute SPD, because the white point is only related to color and unaffected by intensity).

Illuminant and white point are separate concepts. For a given illuminant, its white point is uniquely defined. A given white point, on the other hand, generally does not uniquely correspond to only one illuminant. From the commonly used CIE 1931 chromaticity diagram, it can be seen that almost all non-spectral colors (all except those on the line of purples), including colors described as white, can be produced by infinitely many combinations of spectral colors, and therefore by infinitely many different illuminant spectra.

Although there is generally no one-to-one correspondence between illuminants and white points, in the case of the CIE D-series standard illuminants, the spectral power distributions are mathematically derivable from the chromaticity coordinates of the corresponding white points.

Knowing the illuminant's spectral power distribution, the reflectance spectrum of the specified white object (often taken as unity), and the numerical definition of the observer allows the coordinates of the white point in any color space to be defined. For example, one of the simplest illuminants is the "E" or "Equal Energy" spectrum. Its spectral power distribution is flat, giving the same power per unit wavelength at any wavelength. In terms of both the 1931 and 1964 CIE XYZ color spaces, its color coordinates are [k, k, k], where k is a constant, and its chromaticity coordinates are [x, y] = [⅓, ⅓].

== White point conversion ==
If the color of an object is recorded under one illuminant, then it is possible to estimate the color of that object under another illuminant, given only the white points of the two illuminants. If the image is "uncalibrated" (the illuminant's white point unknown), the white point has to be estimated. However, if one merely wants to white balance (make neutral objects appear neutral in the recording), this may not be necessary.

Expressing color as tristimulus coordinates in the LMS color space, one can "translate" the object's color according to the Von Kries transform simply by scaling the LMS coordinates by the ratio of the maximum of the tristimulus values at both white points. This provides a simple, but rough estimate. Another method that is sometimes preferred uses a Bradford transform or another chromatic adaptation transform; in general, these work by transforming into an intermediate space, scaling the amounts of the primaries in that space, and converting back by the inverse transform.

To truly calculate the color of an object under another illuminant, not merely how it will be perceived, it is necessary to record multi-spectral or hyper-spectral color information.
