= Coral (color) =

Shade of orange

Color coordinates
- Hex triplet: #FF7F50
- sRGB^{B} (r, g, b): (255, 127, 80)
- HSV (h, s, v): (16°, 69%, 100%)
- CIELCh_{uv} (L, C, h): (67, 110, 24°)
- Source: HTML/CSS; X11 color names
- ISCC–NBS descriptor: Vivid reddish pink
- B: Normalized to [0–255] (byte)

The various tones of the color coral are orange, red and pink representations of the colors of those cnidarians known as precious corals.

The web color coral is a shade of orange. It is displayed adjacent. Other modern color schemes use different shades of orange or red.

The first recorded use of coral as a color name in English was in 1513.

== Variations of coral ==
=== Coral red ===
Coral red

Color coordinates
- Hex triplet: #FF4040
- sRGB^{B} (r, g, b): (255, 64, 64)
- HSV (h, s, v): (0°, 75%, 100%)
- CIELCh_{uv} (L, C, h): (57, 150, 12°)
- Source: ColorHexa
- B: Normalized to [0–255] (byte)

The color coral red is displayed next to this block of text.

=== Coral pink ===
Coral pink

Color coordinates
- Hex triplet: #F88379
- sRGB^{B} (r, g, b): (248, 131, 121)
- HSV (h, s, v): (5°, 51%, 97%)
- CIELCh_{uv} (L, C, h): (68, 89, 16°)
- Source: ISCC-NBS
- ISCC–NBS descriptor: Deep yellowish red
- B: Normalized to [0–255] (byte)

The color coral pink is displayed adjacent, a pinkish color.

The complementary color of coral pink is teal. The first recorded use of coral pink as a color name in English was in 1892. Late in 2016, the color sample was renamed Coral Red by Pantone, as the RGB, hex and HTML color table showed the same color as being reddish, standing against popular belief of pinkish.

Still today, some people call coral red "coral pink" due to this old attribution.

The normalized color coordinates for coral pink are identical to Congo pink, which was first recorded as a color name in English in 1912.

=== Light coral ===
Light coral

Color coordinates
- Hex triplet: #F08080
- sRGB^{B} (r, g, b): (240, 128, 128)
- HSV (h, s, v): (0°, 47%, 94%)
- CIELCh_{uv} (L, C, h): (66, 82, 12°)
- Source: HTML/CSS; X11 color names
- ISCC–NBS descriptor: Deep pink
- B: Normalized to [0–255] (byte)

The web color light coral is a pinkish-light orange color as displayed adjacent. It is also a HTML/CSS color name and a X11 color name.

== Gallery ==
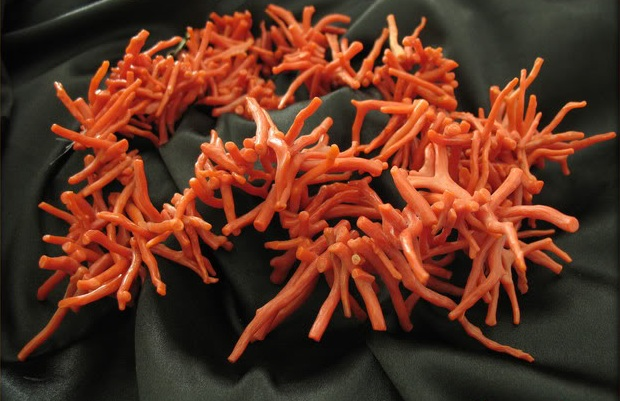
A coral-colored Algerian coral

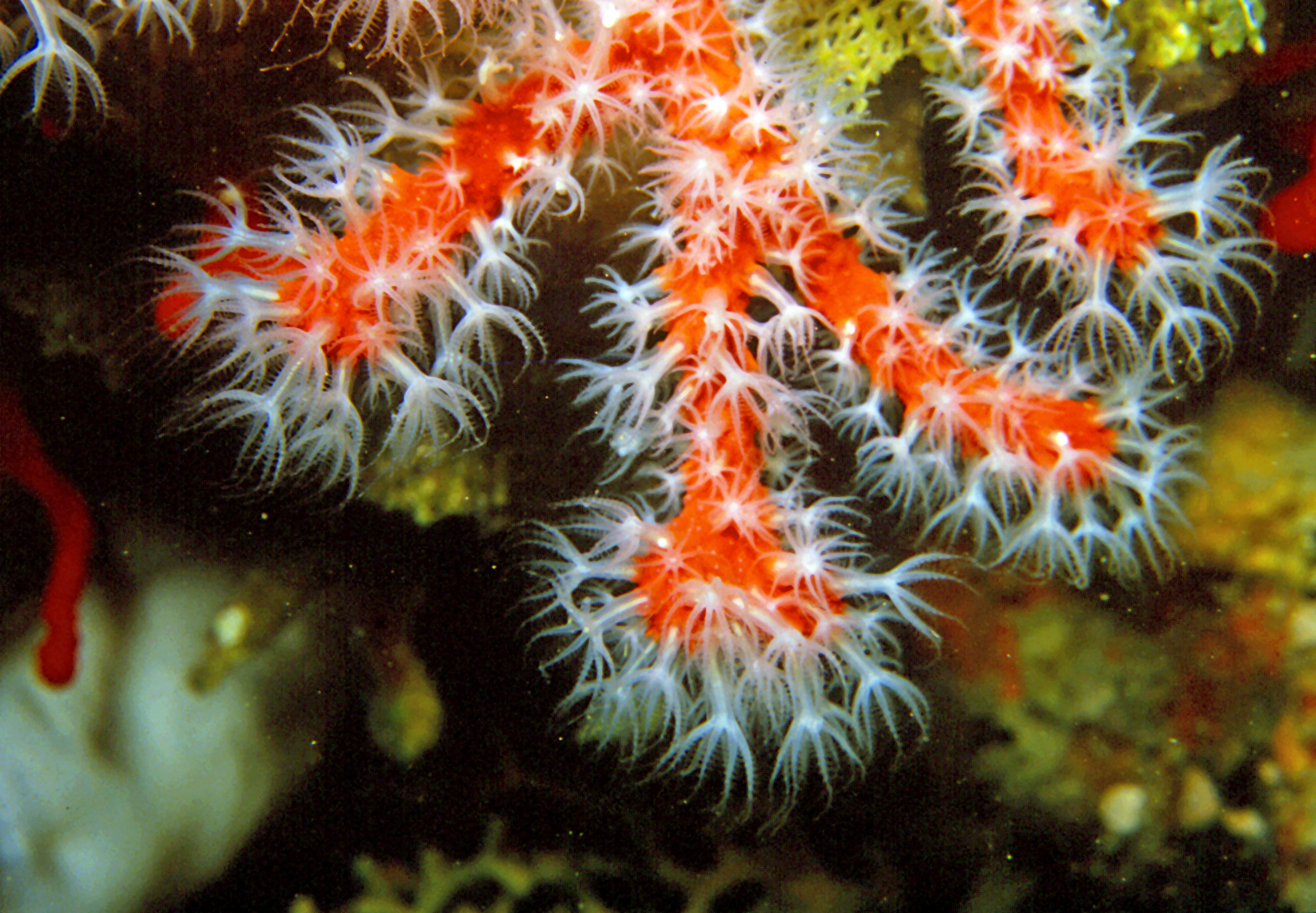
Precious coral (Corallium rubrum)

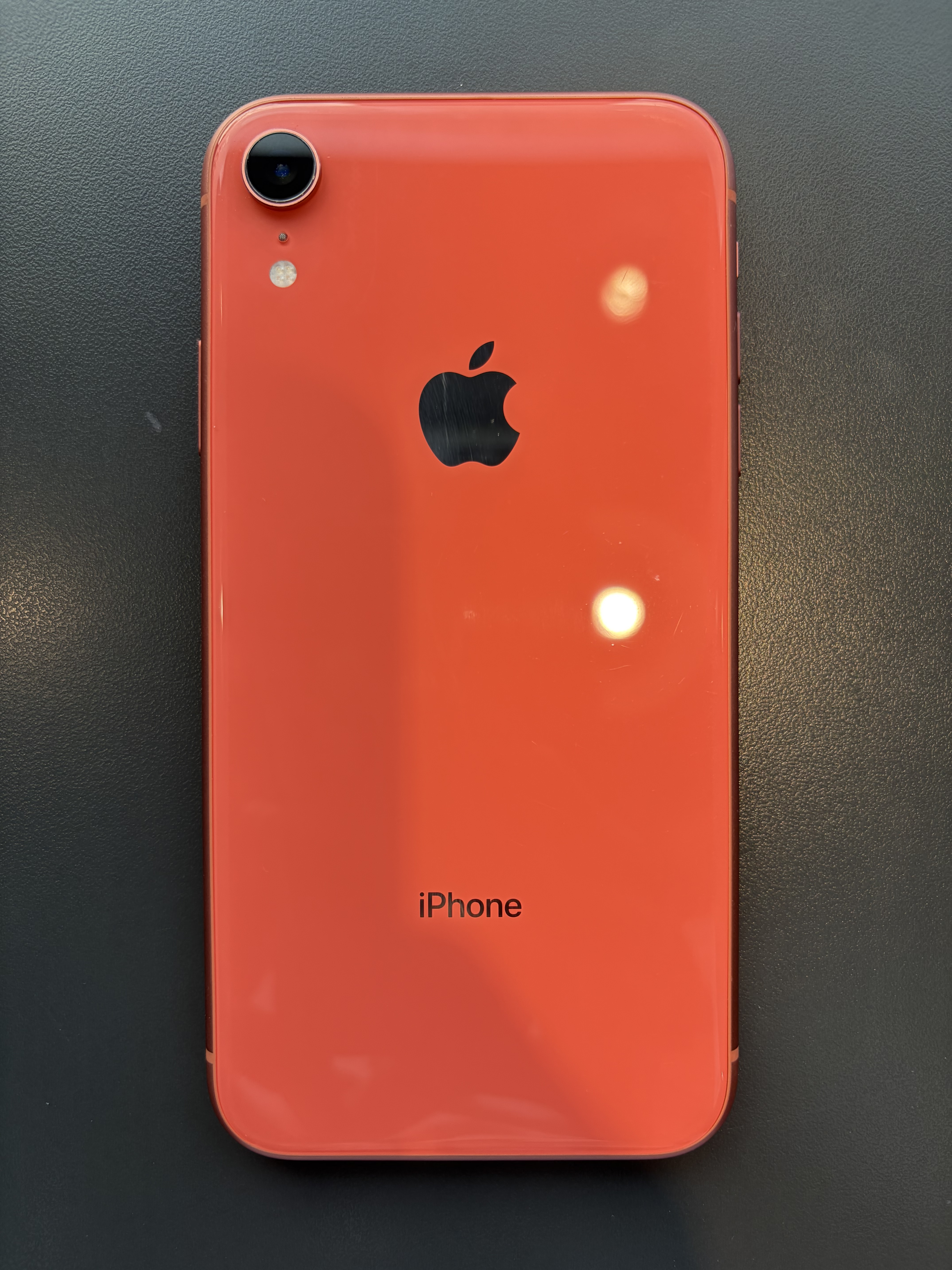
iPhone XR in coral

== See also ==
- List of colors
- RAL 3016 Coral red
