= Memory color effect =

Color perception phenomenon

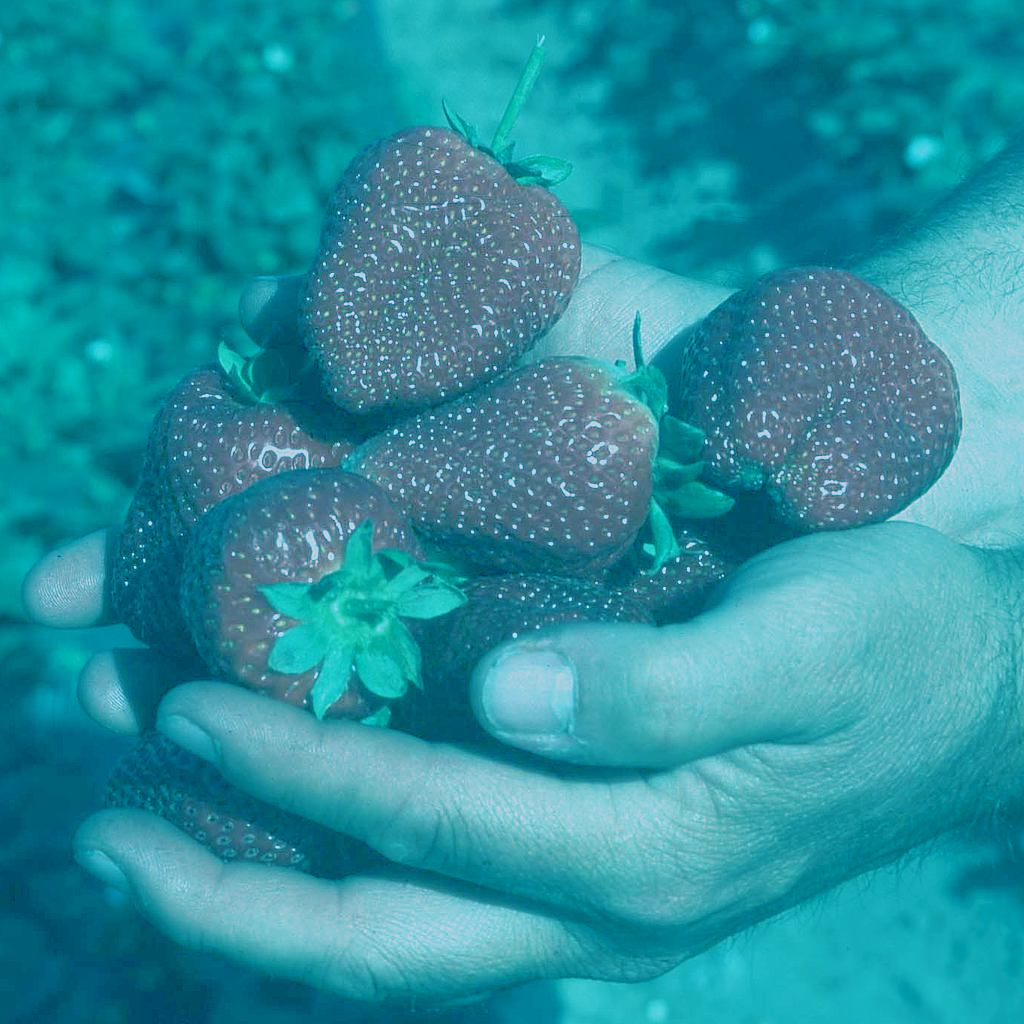
The memory color of a strawberry is recognisable to most viewers even when, as here, a photograph of them has been manipulated so that the red is literally gray

The memory color effect is the phenomenon that the canonical hue of a type of object acquired through experience (e.g. the sky, a leaf, or a strawberry) can directly modulate the appearance of the actual colors of objects.

Human observers acquire memory colors through their experiences with instances of that type. For example, most human observers know that an apple typically has a reddish hue; this knowledge about the canonical color which is represented in memory constitutes a memory color.

As an example of the effect, normal human trichromats, when presented with a gray banana, often perceive the gray banana as being yellow - the banana's memory color. In light of this, subjects typically adjust the color of the banana towards the color blue - the opponent color of yellow - when asked to adjust its surface to gray to cancel the subtle activation of banana's memory color. Subsequent empirical studies have also shown the memory color effect on man-made objects (e.g. smurfs, German mailboxes), the effect being especially pronounced for blue and yellow objects. To explain this, researchers have argued that because natural daylight shifts from short wavelengths of light (i.e., bluish hues) towards light of longer wavelengths (i.e., yellowish-orange hues) during the day, the memory colors for blue and yellow objects are recruited by the visual system to a higher degree to compensate for this fluctuation in illumination, thereby providing a stronger memory color effect.

== Form identification ==
Memory color plays a role when detecting an object. In a study where participants were given objects, such as an apple, with two alternate forms for each, a crooked apple and a circular apple, researchers changed the colors of the alternate forms and asked if they could identify them. Most of the participants answered "unsure," suggesting that we use memory color when identifying an object. The research redefined memory color as a phenomenon when "a form's identity affects the phenomenal hue of that form."

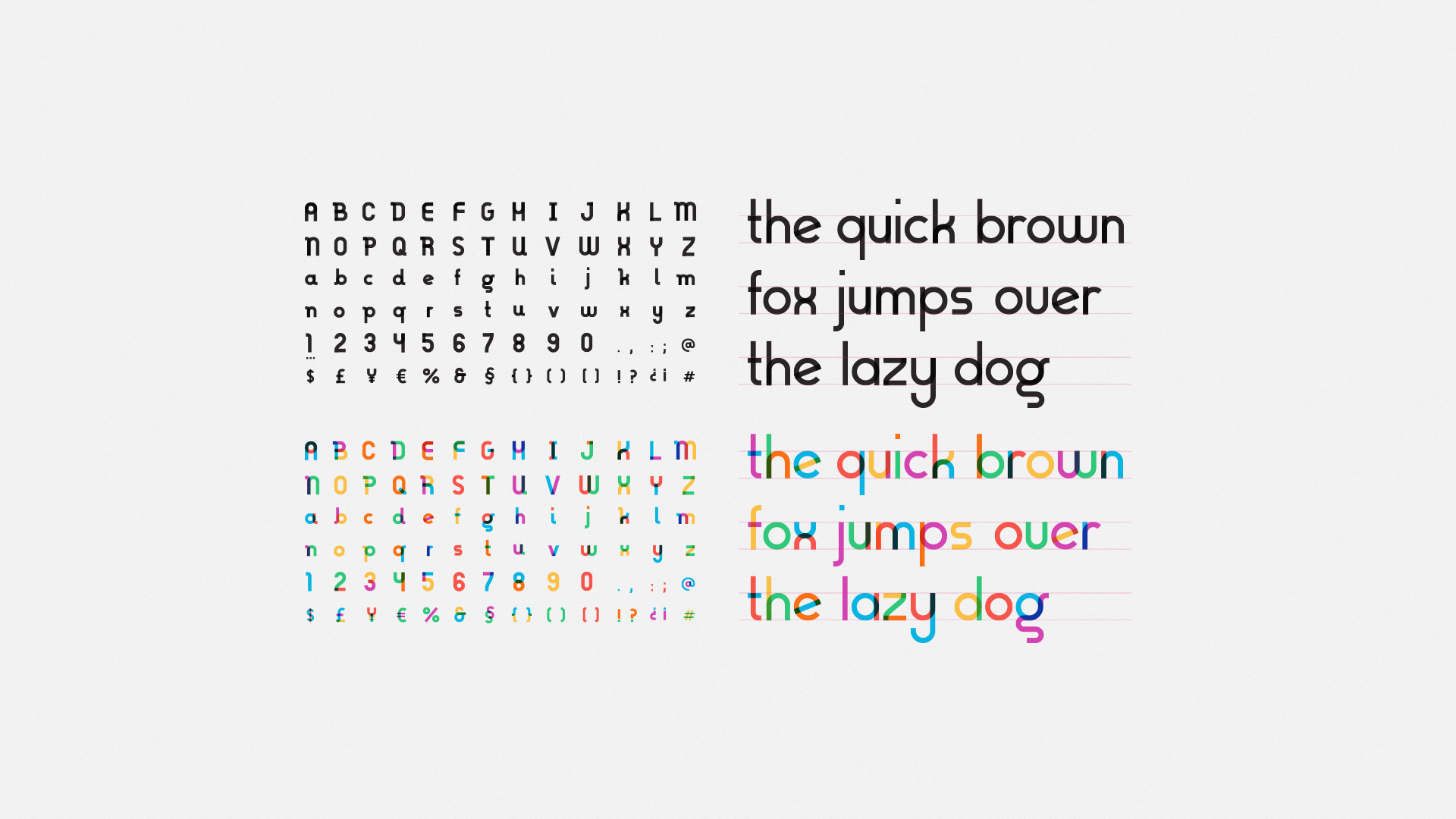
Black words vs. Colored words

== Color effect on memorization ==
Memory color effect can be derived from the human instinct to memorize objects better. Comparing the effect of recognizing gray-scaled images and colored images, results showed that people were able to recall colored images 5% higher compared to gray-scaled images. An important factor was that higher level of contrast between the object and background color influences memory. In a specific study related to this, participants reported that colors were 5% to 10% easier to recognize compared to black and white.

== Color constancy and memory color effect ==
Color constancy is the phenomenon where a surface to appear to be of the same color under a wide rage of illumination. A study tested two hypotheses with regards to color memory; the photoreceptor hypothesis and the surface reflectance hypothesis. The test color was surround either by various color patches forming a complex pattern or a uniform “grey” field at the same chromaticity as that of the illuminant. The test color was presented on a dark background for the control group. It was observed that complex surround results where in line with the surface-reflectance hypothesis and not the photoreceptor hypothesis, showing that the accuracy and precision of color memory are fundamentals to understanding the phenomenon of color constancy.

== Significance to the evolution of trichromacy ==
While objects that possess canonical hues make up a small percentage of the objects which populate humans’ visual experience, the human visual system evolved in an environment populated with objects that possess canonical hues. This suggests that the memory color effect is related to the emergence of trichromacy because it has been argued that trichromacy evolved to optimize the ability to detect ripe fruits—objects that appear in canonical hues.

== In perception research ==
In perception research, the memory color effect is cited as evidence for the opponent color theory, which states that four basic colors can be paired with its opponent color: red—green, blue—yellow. This explains why participants adjust the ripe banana color to a blueish tone to make its memory color yellow as gray. Researchers have also found empirical evidence that suggests memory color is recruited by the visual system to achieve color constancy. For example, participants had a lower percentage of color constancy when looking at a color incongruent scene, such as a purple banana, compared to a color diagnostical scene, a yellow banana. This suggests that color constancy is influenced by the color of objects that we are familiar with, which the memory color effect takes part.
