= Shadow and highlight enhancement =

Image processing technique to correct exposure

Shadow and highlight enhancement refers to an image processing technique used to correct exposure.

The use of this technique has been gaining popularity, making its way onto magazine covers, digital media, and photos. It is, however, considered by some to be akin to other destructive Photoshop filters, such as the Watercolor filter, or the Mosaic filter.

== Shadow recovery ==
A conservative application of the shadow/highlight tool can be very useful in recovering shadows, though it tends to leave a telltale halo around the boundary between highlight and shadow if used incorrectly. A way to avoid this is to use the bracketing technique, although this usually requires a tripod.

== Highlight recovery ==
Recovering highlights with this tool, however, has mixed results, especially when using it on images with skin in them, and often makes people look like they have been "sprayed with fake tan".

== Shadow brightening - manual ==
One way to brighten shadows in image editing software such as GIMP or Adobe Photoshop is to duplicate the background layer, invert the copy and set the blend modes of that top layer to "Soft Light". You can also use an inverted black and white copy of the image as a mask on a brightening layer, such as Curves or Levels.

== Shadow brightening - automatic ==
Several automatic computer image processing-based shadow recovery and dynamic range compression methods can yield a similar effect. Some of these methods include the retinex method and homomorphic range compression. The retinex method is based on work from 1963 by Edwin Land, the founder of Polaroid.

Shadow enhancement can also be accomplished using adaptive image processing algorithms such as adaptive histogram equalization or contrast limiting adaptive histogram equalization (CLAHE).

== See also ==
- HDR PhotoStudio — an HDR image editing tool that implements an advanced Shadow/highlight algorithm with halo reduction technique.
- Tone mapping
