= Wound healing assay =

Laboratory assessment of re-epithelialization in cell cultures

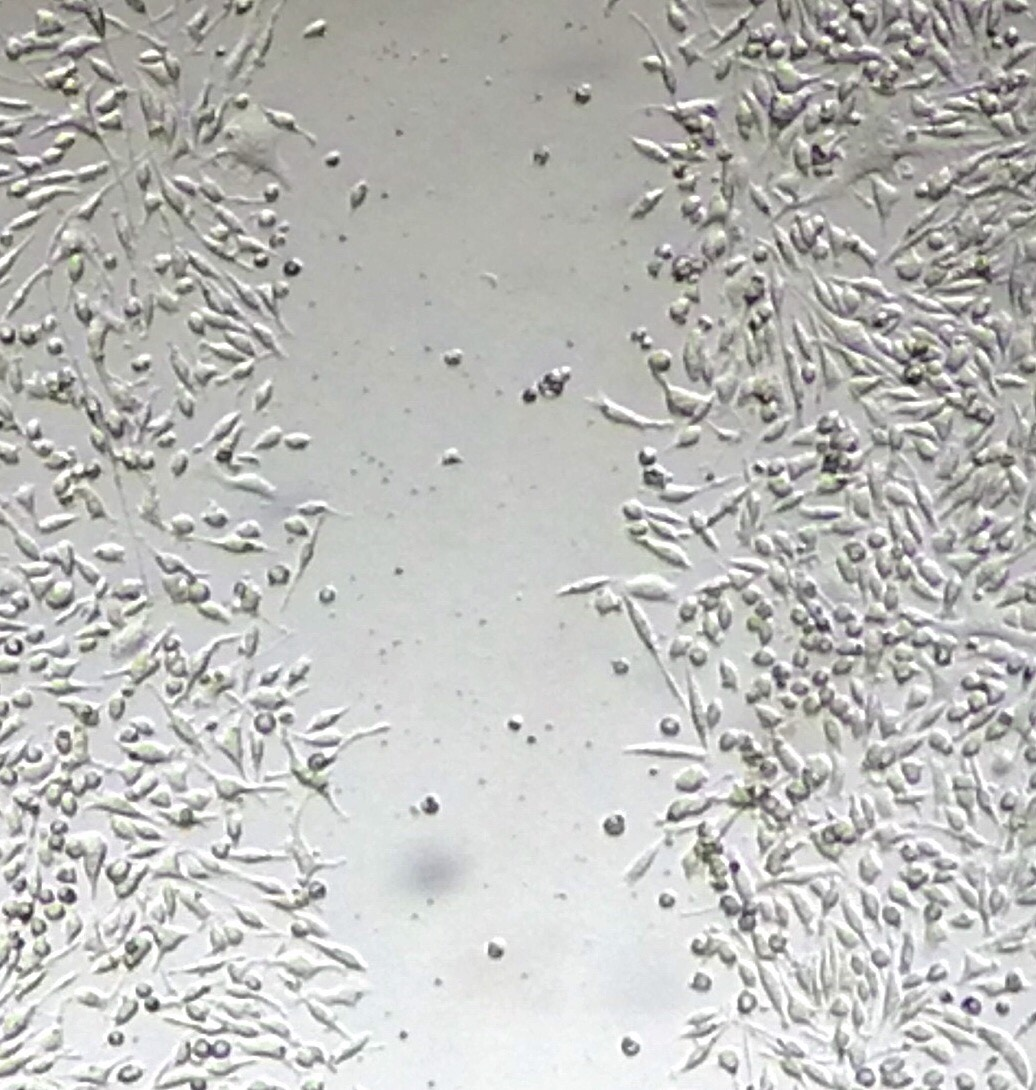
Scratch wound healing assay experiment of rhabdomyosarcoma, a cancer cell line.

A wound healing assay is a laboratory technique used to study cell migration and cell–cell interaction. This is also called a scratch assay because it is done by making a scratch on a cell monolayer and capturing images at regular intervals by time lapse microscopy.

It is specifically a 2D cell migration approach to semi-quantitatively measure cell migration of a sheet of cells. This scratch can be made through various approaches, such as mechanical, thermal, or chemical damage. The purpose of this scratch is to produce a cell-free area in hopes of inducing cells to migrate and close the gap. The scratch test is ideal for cell types that migrate in collective epithelial sheets and is not generally useful for non-adherent cells. Specifically, this assay isn't ideal for chemotaxis studies.

== Advantages and disadvantages ==
This laboratory technique has various advantages. First, these tests are relatively cheap, relatively straightforward and allow for real-time measurements. Additionally, the testing conditions can be easily adjusted to fit different experimental objectives. This approach also allows for a strong directional migratory response making quantifying data simple.

One limitation of this assay is that there could be inconsistencies with the depth and size of the scratch. When the scratch is done manually, it's susceptible to 'ragged' edge boundaries, which make analyzing data more difficult. Also, the damage could physically damage the cells adjacent to the wound and create inaccurate wound size areas. This limitation is slowly becoming less of an issue with automated technologies. The Electric Cell Impendance Sensing assays utilize to prevent damage to the cells in the underlying extracellular matrix that can likely happen with the manual scratching approaches. Additionally, the Woundmaker makes fast and uniform wounds across various numbered well-plates options (96 or 384) and allows for high throughput screening, which is a major advantage for various medical research studies.

Despite the new technology that is increasing this assay's accuracy and efficacy, there are still confounding factors that can skew the assay results, such as cell "crowding", cell/cell adhesion effects and matrix effects. Additionally, there is still mention with the problem of accumulation of cells at the edge of the scratch, making the cell densities uneven.

There are some skeptics who think that the scratch created for the assay isn't a very accurate representation of an actual wound. This is very likely true as real wounds are inherently more complex, but this assay does allow for collective cell movements under defined experimental conditions to provide some insight.

Despite it being described as straightforward, the technique has been criticized because of inconsistencies in its application from one experiment to another.

== Standard laboratory protocol ==
Outlined is a standard approach to carry-out this assay without the advanced technology:

1. Plate cells of choice in growth medium into a live cell imaging dish or chamber slide. It is important to ensure that a monolayer is formed as clumps will provide inaccurate results due to an uneven cell density. Titrating the cells to determine the optimal plating density is necessary.
2. When the confluency of the cells are ideal, use a pipette tip to scratch a wound through the entire center of the well. As mentioned previously, this is where the potential inconsistency comes into play with this assay. If the scratch is made manually, it is important to make sure that the wound is visible on both side of the field of view and should be around 0.5 mm wide.
3. The cells can then be placed on a microscope with a relative objective of 20x.
4. Begin time-lapse microscopy and adjust the parameters according to the variety of cells studying. Fast-growing cells may require shorter time intervals to acquire more accurate cell speed.

== Applications ==
- Quantitative/qualitative analysis of collective cell migration under changeable experimental conditions.
- Analysis of cell-matrix and cell-cell interactions with respect to cell migration.
- High-throughput screens for:
  - Cancer cell migration genes
  - Small molecules
  - Drug discovery

== Metrics to quantify cell migration ==
Rate of cell migration:

- $R_M = (W_i - W_f)/t$

where

R_{M} = Rate of cell migration
W_{I} = Initial wound width
W_{f} = Final wound width
t = duration of migration

Relative wound density:

- $\% RWD(t) = [(w_t-w_0)/(c_t-w_0)] * 100$

where

w_{t} = Density of the wound area at time t
c_{t} = Density of the cell area at time t

The above are basic metrics that can be measured with this assay. However efforts are still being made to improve the interpretation of this assay. Three different measurements: direct rate average, regression rate average and average distance regression rate have been evaluated. Direct rate average and average distance regression rate were more resistant to outliers, whereas regression rate average were more sensitive to outliers.

== Cell migration ==
The scratch assay is a great tool to study cell migration since this mechanism is involved in many different physiological aspects. Cell migration plays a huge role in re-epithelialization of the skin and so the study of cell migration can provide advancements in understanding non-healing wounds. Cell migration is also fundamental in developmental processes such as gastrulation and organogenesis. Cell migration is also involved in immune responses and cancer metastases.

=== Cancer biology ===
With technological advances, this assay is becoming very beneficial especially in the cancer biology realm. A study was performed to better understand the role that claudin-7, a family of tight junction proteins, plays in cell migration in a type of human lung cancer cells. Due to the slower migration rate of claudin-7 knockdown cells, it supports the idea that this protein is important in cell migration an cell's ability to metastasize. Cells undergo sheet migration due to a multitude of signals and mechanisms when trying to close a wound, which is believed to be similar to the underlying mechanisms involved in metastasis.

== Alternatives to the wound healing assay ==
Using label-free live cell imaging devices based on quantitative phase imaging, it has been shown that cell motility is highly correlated to wound healing and transwell assay results. The advantage of this fully automated approach is that quantification of cell motility does not require specific sample preparation, allowing cell proliferation to be simultaneously quantified as well.
