= Munsell =

Munsell may refer to:

- The Munsell color system, the first perceptually uniform color space
- Albert Henry Munsell (1858–1918), American painter, teacher of art, and the inventor of the Munsell color system
- Harvey M. Munsell, American soldier in the Civil War.
- Hazel E. Munsell (1891–1989), American chemist and educator
- Joel Munsell (1808–1880), American publisher
- Munsell Color Company
- Munsell color system developed by the company above
  - Farnsworth-Munsell 100 hue test
- Munsell, Missouri, a community in the United States

== See also ==
- Munsel
