= Munsell Color Company =

Publisher and educational supplies company

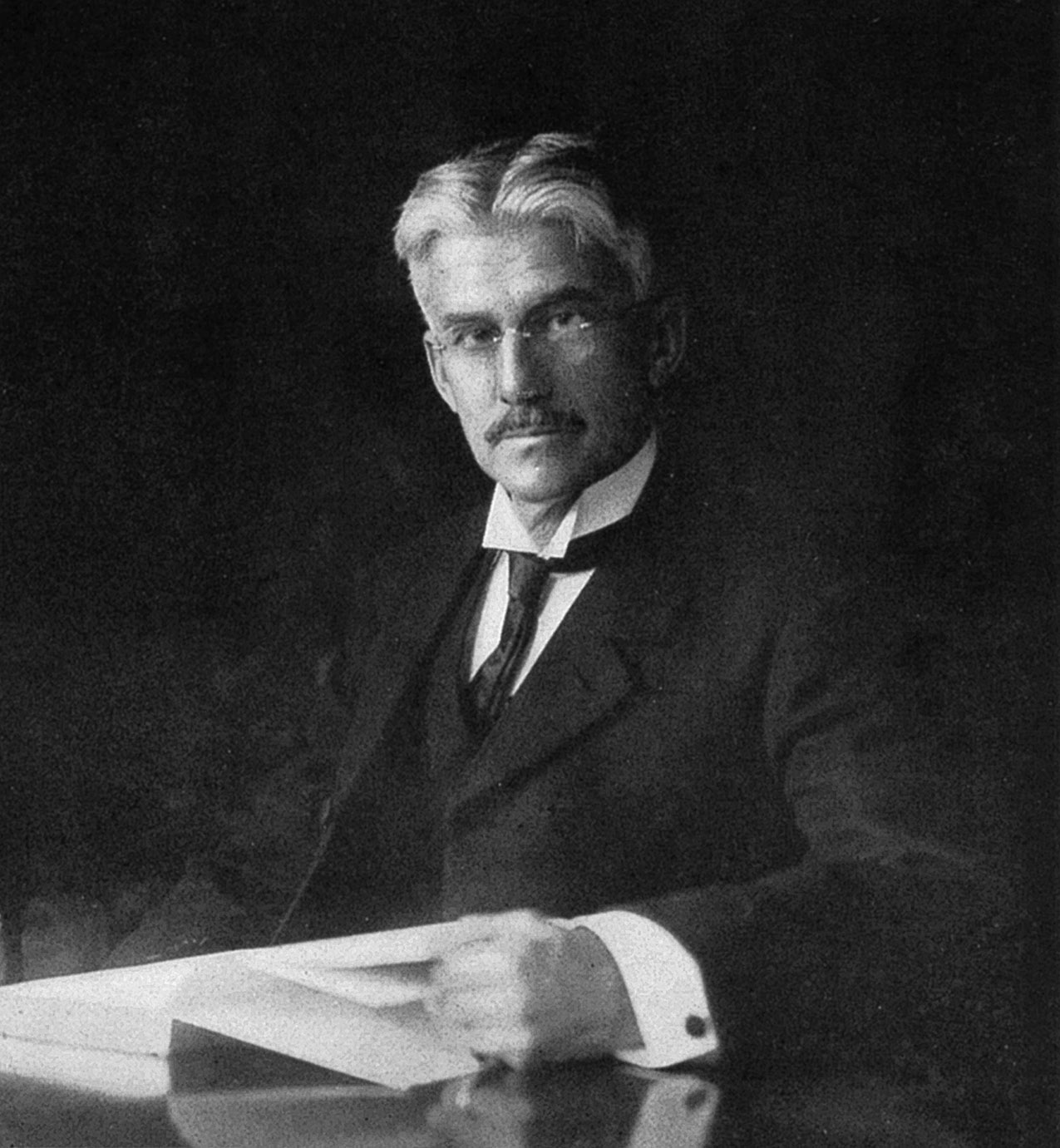
The founder of Munsell Color Company, Professor Albert H. Munsell

The Munsell Color Company was founded by Albert H. Munsell in 1917 with two other stockholders, Arthur Allen and Ray Greenleaf. It was in Boston. The company was manufactured to conduct business by publishing books, selling color supplies for schools such as crayons, water colors, paper colors and school supplies and to teach the principles of Munsell Color System. After the death of Albert H. Munsell, his son, Alexander Ector Orr Munsell, was convinced to take over the company and reorganized it, renamed as the Munsell Color Foundation. The Munsell Color Foundation moved to New York for educational purposes and established the Munsell Research Laboratory which was funded by the Munsell family. A few years later, the Munsell Color Foundation and the Laboratory moved to Baltimore, Maryland, to be close to the National Bureau of Standards and Johns Hopkins University. Alexander Munsell contributed his times attending to Johns Hopkins University and under the guidance from I. G. Priest, in order for Alexander continuing researching on his father's works. In 1983, the Foundation trustees had voted to close Munsell Color Foundation and donated to Rochester Institute of Technology, from which it created the Munsell Color Science Laboratory.

== Short biography of Albert H. Munsell ==
Albert H. Munsell was born in Boston on January 6, 1858 and died on June 24, 1918. During his youth, he studied arts in Massachusetts Normal Art School and went abroad to École des Beaux-Arts in Paris to further studied arts. Impressionist arts movement was a big hit during his time. He won some awards for his work in anatomy, perspective and composition. His artworks were praised and exhibited in Boston, New York, Pittsburgh and Chicago. Most of his paintings were seascape artwork. When Albert Munsell went back to Massachusetts, he became a teacher of drawing and painting from antique figures, models, composition and anatomy.

During the early 1900s, Albert Munsell kept diaries on the development of Munsell color space. The reason he developed the Munsell Color System was to make the colors easy and convenient to teach children, since he believed that if children were properly taught, colors would be more meaningful and useful for them through life. He devoted his time to continue working on his Munsell color space.

In 1917 Albert H. Munsell founded the Munsell Color Company. He invested his time working on the Munsell Color System and published some books which were called A Color Notation (1905), Atlas of Munsell Color System (1915) and A Grammar of Color: Arrangements of Strathmore Papers in a Variety of Printed Color Combinations According to The Munsell Color System (1921). He was the first one to create the Munsell color system to separate three attributes – hue, value, and chroma – to be perceptually uniform. The data of the Munsell color system was the most accurate measurement of human's visual responses to color.

== Munsell Color Foundation ==
The Munsell Color Company was founded by Albert H. Munsell, who devoted his time to developing a color order system. The share owners of the stock besides Albert Munsell were Arthur Allen and Ray Greenleaf. Albert Munsell developed the color system based on human perception. And yet, his color system became popular and is still used worldwide today. The Munsell Color Company was formed to carry business by publishing books and charts, crayons, water colors, color spheres, paper colors and school supplies. After the death of Albert Munsell, his family supported the company in memorial of him. The company later reorganized as the Munsell Color Foundation and moved to New York. The foundation was set up as the Munsell Color Laboratory to continue the scientific work of Munsell color system.

Albert's son, Alexander Ector Orr Munsell, was convinced by Allen and Greenleaf to agree to take over the position of CEO of the Munsell Color Foundation. Alexander did not care much about the business and artist aspect. He only cared about the scientific aspect of Albert Munsell's work. So Alexander decided to turn over the making and the handling of Munsell crayons to the Binney and Smith Company and the school supplies to Favor, Ruhl and Company. The only things left in the Munsell Color Company were the production of the Atlas papers, charts, disks and Munsell publications. At the same time, the Munsell Color Foundation and Munsell Color Laboratory moved to Baltimore, Maryland, where it was near to the National Bureau of Standards and Johns Hopkins University. Alexander intended to do some laboratory research with the spectrophotometer, artificial daylight, darkroom, and painting posters near Hopkins University under the guidance of I.G. Priest. Based on his successful research, the Munsell Book of Color was published, replacing Albert Munsell's Atlas of Munsell Color System.

Later, the Munsell Color Foundation became a nonprofit organization. Alexander no longer had time to worry about the business aspect of his company when he was focusing on researching. So he attended an open meeting with the leaders in the color field and confirmed that Munsell Color Foundation gave up the business. The National Bureau of Standards and Inter-Society Color Council appointed special trustees to serve on the board of trustees. Those trustees were appointed to represent the color interests of science and educational fields. The purpose of this company serves “to further the scientific and practical advancement of color knowledge and in particular knowledge relating to standardization, nomenclature, and specification of color, and to promote the practical application of these results to color problems arising in science, art and industry.’.

In 1983, the Foundation Board of Trustees voted to close the Munsell Color Foundation. They had donated the endowment of the Munsell Color Science Laboratory to the Rochester Institute of Technology who was selected as a recipient. Most of the products that were owned by the Munsell Color Foundation are now owned by the X-Rite company.

=== Munsell Color Science Laboratory ===
The Board of Trustees of the Munsell Color Foundation voted to close down the foundation and donated the Munsell Color Laboratory to a selected recipient, the Rochester Institute of Technology. The Munsell Color Science Laboratory was originally located in RIT's Chester F. Carlson Center for Imaging Science but later moved to its own building. The creation of the Munsell Color Science Laboratory was thanks to the effort of Franc Grum, who was the first Director of the Munsell Color Science Laboratory and R.S. Hunter, who was a professor of Color Science. Franc Grum used to be an employee of Munsell Color Foundation. Currently, the purpose of this laboratory is to aim the improvement of scientific researches toward Imaging Science Field.

=== Contributions of Munsell Color Foundation ===
Albert H. Munsell's books

A Color Notation
Altas of Munsell Color System
A Grammar of Color: Arrangements of Strathmore Papers in a Variety of Printed Color Combinations According to The Munsell Color System

Munsell Color Company

Photometer invented by Munsell
Munsell Crayons

Munsell Color Foundation

Munsell Book of Color (improved version than Altas of Munsell Color System)
Universal Photometer
Farnsworth Munsell 100 Hue Color Vision Test
Munsell Color Tree

== X-Rite ==
Logo of X-Rite Incorporated

X-Rite is a manufacturer of color matching products continuing to focus on the field of Imaging Science. The company is in Grand Rapids, Michigan. X-ray marking tape was their first product introduced in 1961. Before, X-Rite was primary working on the products related to the processing of film and x-rays. Later, X-Rite eventually shifted into the field of color measurement. They had purchased the products of Munsell and other Imaging Science companies. X-Rite has kept the products of Munsell and other Imaging Science products alive so for future generations to use them.

== See also ==
- Albert Henry Munsell
- Munsell color system
- CIE 1931 color space
- CIELAB color space
- Colorimeter
- Photometer
