= Munsel =

Munsel is a surname. Notable people with the surname include:

- Patrice Munsel (1925–2016), American coloratura soprano
- Matthew Munsel Howard (1794–1879), Canadian miller, farmer, and political figure

Munsel in Tibetan means “Eliminator of Darkness.” Used in spiritual names in Buddhism

== See also ==
- Munsell (disambiguation)
