= Color solid =

Three-dimensional representation of a color space

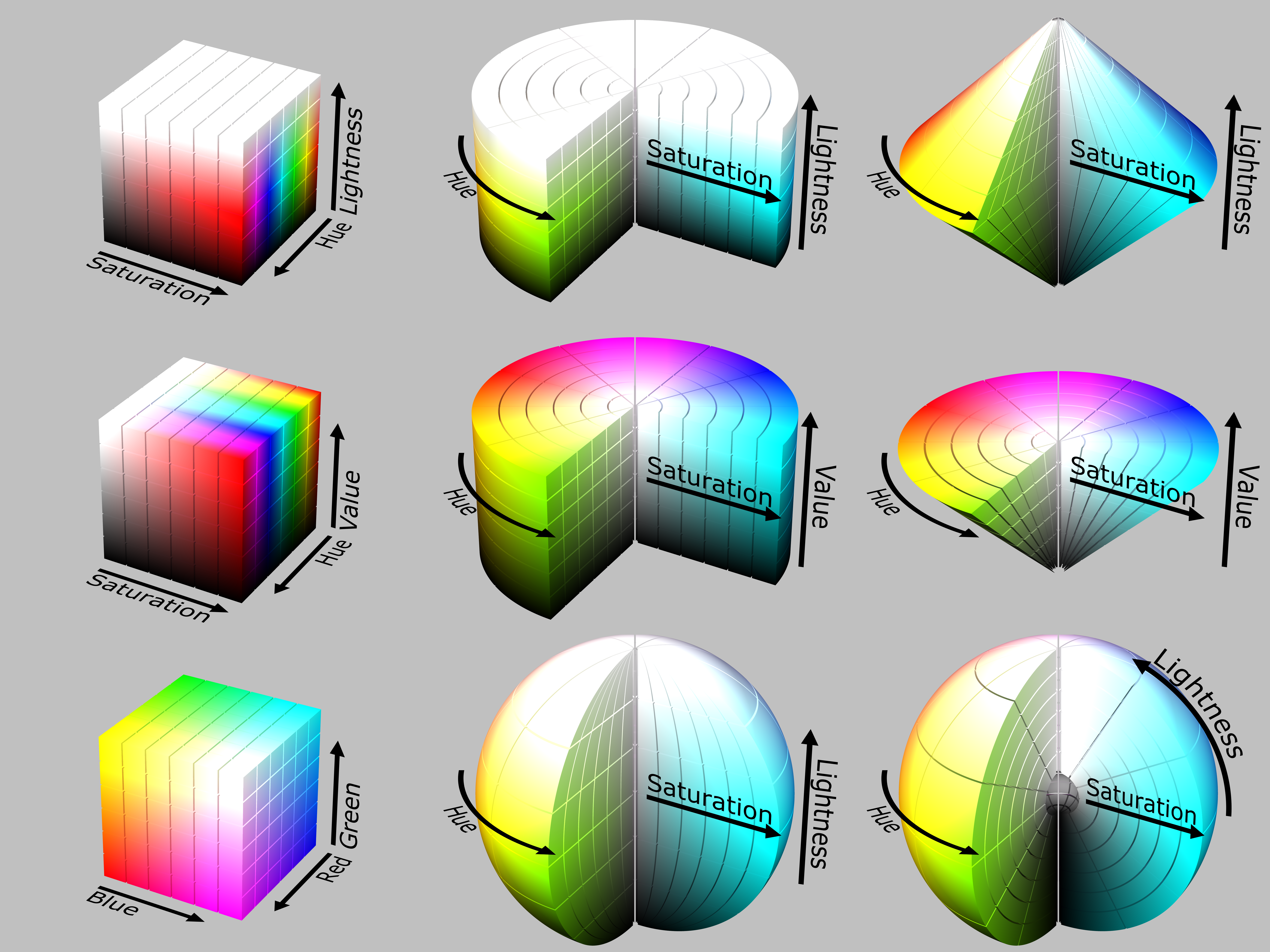
Side-by-side comparison of several different color solids for the HSL, HSV, and RGB color models. Potential shapes include cubes, cylinders, cones, spheres, pyramids, bipyramids, bicones, and irregular shapes.

Painters long mixed colors by combining relatively bright pigments with black and white. Mixtures with white are called tints, mixtures with black are called shades, and mixtures with both are called tones. See Tints and shades.

Optimal color solid plotted within the CIE L* a* b* color space (left or top), and within the CIE L* u* v* color space (right or bottom), both with D65 white point. Because they are (approximately) perceptually uniform color spaces, the optimal color solids have an irregular, not spherical shape. Notice they have two sharp edges, one edge with warm colors, and the other edge with cool colors.

A color solid is the three-dimensional representation of a color space or model and can be thought as an analog of, for example, the one-dimensional color wheel, which depicts the variable of hue (similarity with red, yellow, green, blue, etc.); or the 2D chromaticity diagram (or the color triangle), which depicts the variables of hue and spectral purity. The added spatial dimension allows a color solid to depict the three dimensions of color: lightness (gradations of light and dark, tints or shades), hue, and colorfulness, allowing the solid to depict all conceivable colors in an organized three-dimensional structure.

== Organization ==
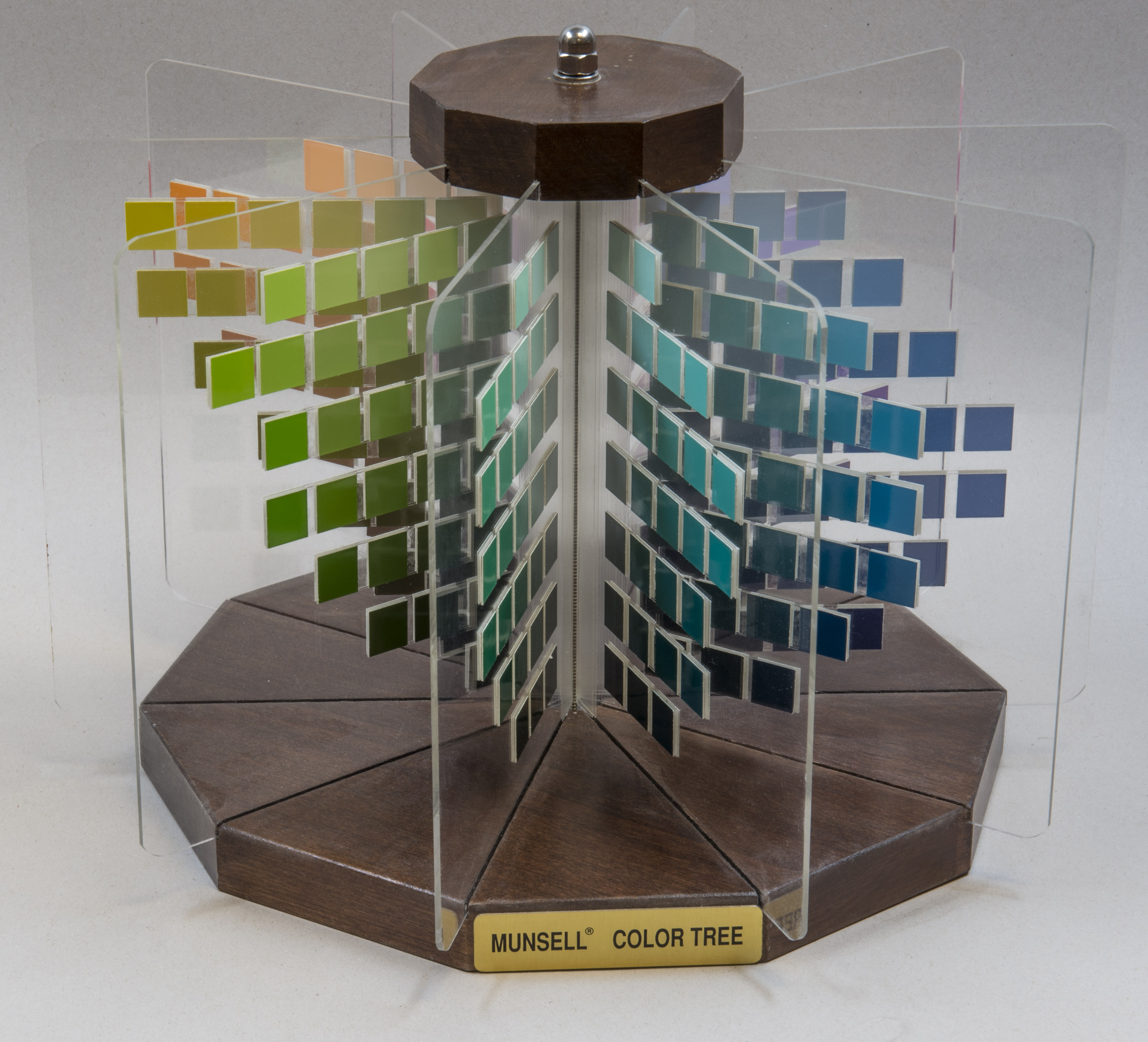
Munsell Color Tree

Different color theorists have each designed unique color solids. Many are in the shape of a sphere, whereas others are warped three-dimensional ellipsoid figures—these variations being designed to express some aspect of the relationship of the colors more clearly. The color spheres conceived by Philipp Otto Runge and Johannes Itten are typical examples and prototypes for many other color solid schematics.

As in the color wheel, contrasting (or complementary) hues are located opposite each other in most color solids. Moving toward the central axis, colors become less and less saturated, until all colors meet at the central axis as a neutral gray. Moving vertically in the color solid, colors become lighter (toward the top) and darker (toward the bottom). At the upper pole, all hues meet in white; at the bottom pole, all hues meet in black.

The vertical axis of the color solid, then, is gray all along its length, varying from black at the bottom to white at the top, it is a grayscale. All pure (saturated) hues are located on the surface of the solid, varying from light to dark down the color solid. All colors that are desaturated in any degree (that is, that they can be thought of containing both black and white in varying amounts) comprise the solid's interior, likewise varying in brightness from top to bottom.

Vertical cross sections of various spherically-shaped color solids

Philipp Otto Runge's Farbenkugel

Albert Henry Munsell's color sphere

Johannes Itten's color sphere

Spherical coordinate system (for comparison)

== Optimal color solid ==
The optimal color solid or Rösch–MacAdam color solid is a type of color solid that contains all the possible colors that surfaces can have. That is, the optimal color solid is the theoretical limit for the color of objects*. It is bounded by the set of all optimal colors. For now, we are unable to produce objects with such colors, at least not without resorting to more complex physical phenomena.

*(with classical reflection. Phenomena like fluorescence or structural coloration may cause the color of objects to lie outside the optimal color solid)

The reflectance spectrum of a color is the amount of light of each wavelength that it reflects, in proportion to a given maximum, which has the value of 1 (100%). If the reflectance spectrum of a color is 0 (0%) or 1 (100%) across the entire visible spectrum, and it has no more than two transitions between 0 and 1, or 1 and 0, then it is an optimal color. With the current state of technology, we are unable to produce any material or pigment with these properties.

Thus four types of "optimal color" spectra are possible:

- The transition goes from zero at both ends of the spectrum to one in the middle, as shown in the image at right.
- It goes from one at the ends to zero in the middle.
- It goes from 1 at the start of the visible spectrum to 0 in some point in the middle until its end.
- It goes from 0 at the start of the visible spectrum to 1 at some point in the middle until its end.

The first type produces colors that are similar to the spectral colors and follow roughly the horseshoe-shaped portion of the CIE xy chromaticity diagram (the spectral locus), but are, in surfaces, more chromatic, although less spectrally pure. The second type produces colors that are similar to (but, in surfaces, more chromatic and less spectrally pure than) the colors on the straight line in the CIE xy chromaticity diagram (the line of purples), leading to magenta or purple-like colors.

Reflectance spectrum of a color-optimal surface. There is no known material with these properties, they are, for what we know, only theoretical.

In optimal color solids, the colors of the visible spectrum are theoretically black, because their reflectance spectrum is 1 (100%) in only one wavelength, and 0 in all of the other infinite visible wavelengths that there are, meaning that they have a lightness of 0 with respect to white, and will also have 0 chroma, but, of course, 100% of spectral purity. In short: In optimal color solids, spectral colors are equivalent to black (0 lightness, 0 chroma), but have full spectral purity (they are located in the horseshoe-shaped spectral locus of the chromaticity diagram).

In linear color spaces, such as LMS or CIE 1931 XYZ, the set of rays that start at the origin (black, (0, 0, 0)) and pass through all the points that represent the colors of the visible spectrum, and the portion of a plane that passes through the violet half-line and the red half-line (both ends of the visible spectrum), generate the "spectrum cone". The black point (coordinates (0, 0, 0)) of the optimal color solid (and only the black point) is tangent to the "spectrum cone", and the white point ((1, 1, 1)) (and only the white point) is tangent to the "inverted spectrum cone", with the "inverted spectrum cone" being symmetrical to the "spectrum cone" with respect to the middle gray point ((0.5, 0.5, 0.5)). This means that, in linear color spaces, the optimal color solid is centrally symmetric.

In most color spaces, the surface of the optimal color solid is smooth, except for two points (black and white); and two sharp edges: the "warm" edge, which goes from black, to red, to orange, to yellow, to white; and the "cool" edge, which goes from black, to deep violet, to blue, to cyan, to white. This is due to the following: If the portion of the reflectance spectrum of a color is spectral red (which is located at one end of the spectrum), it will be seen as black. If the size of the portion of total or reflectance is increased, now covering from the red end of the spectrum to the yellow wavelengths, it will be seen as red. If the portion is expanded even more, covering the green wavelengths, it will be seen as orange or yellow. If it is expanded even more, it will cover more wavelengths than the yellow semichrome does, approaching white, until it is reached when the full spectrum is reflected. The described process is called "cumulation". Cumulation can be started at either end of the visible spectrum (we just described cumulation starting from the red end of the spectrum, generating the "warm" sharp edge), cumulation starting at the violet end of the spectrum will generate the "cool" sharp edge.

Optimal color solid or Rösch–MacAdam color solid (with D65 white point) plotted within CIE 1931 XYZ color space. Notice the central symmetry of the solid, and the two sharp edges, one with warm colors and the other one with cool colors.

=== Maximum chroma colors, semichromes, or full colors ===
Each hue has a maximum chroma point, semichrome, or full color; objects cannot have a color of that hue with a higher chroma. They are the most chromatic, vibrant colors that objects can have. They were called semichromes or full colors by the German chemist and philosopher Wilhelm Ostwald in the early 20th century.

If B is the complementary wavelength of wavelength A, then the straight line that connects A and B passes through the achromatic axis in a linear color space, such as LMS or CIE 1931 XYZ. If the reflectance spectrum of a color is 1 (100%) for all the wavelengths between A and B, and 0 for all the wavelengths of the other half of the color space, then that color is a maximum chroma color, semichrome, or full color (this is the explanation to why they were called semichromes). Thus, maximum chroma colors are a type of optimal color.

As explained, full colors are far from being monochromatic. If the spectral purity of a maximum chroma color is increased, its chroma decreases, because it will approach the visible spectrum, ergo, it will approach black.

In perceptually uniform color spaces, the lightness of the full colors varies from around 30% in the violetish blue hues, to around 90% in the yellowish hues. The chroma of each maximum chroma point also varies depending on the hue; in optimal color solids plotted in perceptually uniform color spaces, semichromes like red, green, blue, violet, and magenta have a high chroma, while semichromes like yellow, orange, and cyan have a slightly lower chroma.

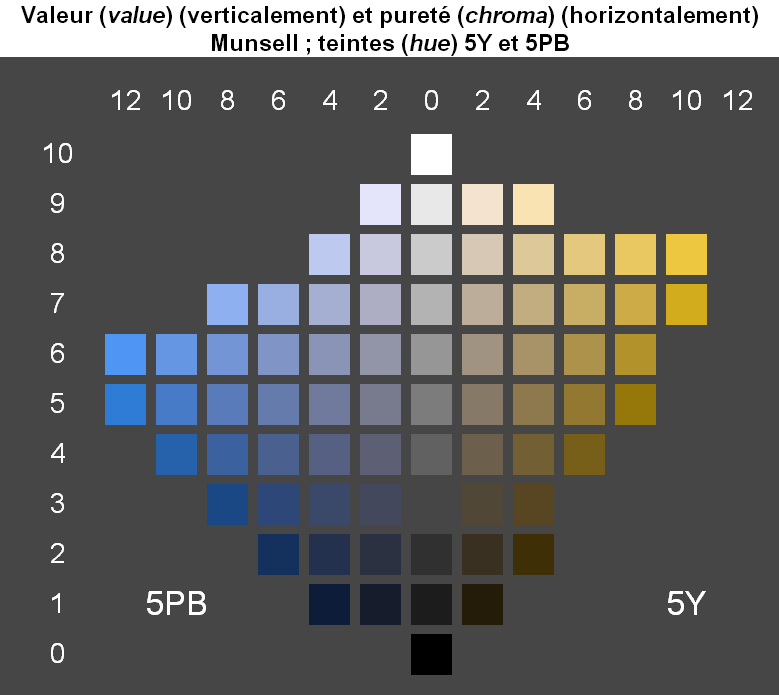
Slice of the Munsell color space in the hues of 5PB and 5Y. The point farthest from the achromatic axis in each of these two hue slices is the maximum chroma color, semichrome, or full color of that hue.

In color spheres and the HSL color space, the maximum chroma colors are located around the equator at the periphery of the color sphere. This makes color solids with a spherical shape inherently non-perceptually uniform, since they imply that all full colors have a lightness of 50%, when, as humans perceive them, there are full colors with a lightness from around 30% to around 90%. A perceptually uniform color solid has an irregular shape.

=== History of the idea of optimal colors ===
In the beginning of the 20th century, industrial demands for a controllable way to describe colors and the new possibility to measure light spectra initiated intense research on mathematical descriptions of colors.

The idea of optimal colors was introduced by the Baltic German chemist Wilhelm Ostwald. Erwin Schrödinger showed in his 1919 article Theorie der Pigmente von größter Leuchtkraft (Theory of Pigments with Highest Luminosity) that the most-saturated colors that can be created with a given total reflectivity are generated by surfaces having either zero or full reflectance at any given wavelength, and the reflectivity spectrum must have at most two transitions between zero and full.

MacAdam limits for illuminant CIE F4 in CIE xyY color space

Schrödinger's work was further developed by David MacAdam and Siegfried Rösch. MacAdam was the first person to calculate precise coordinates of selected points on the boundary of the optimal color solid in the CIE 1931 color space for lightness levels from Y = 10 to 95 in steps of 10 units. This enabled him to draw the optimal color solid at an acceptable degree of precision. Because of his achievement, the boundary of the optimal color solid is called the MacAdam limit (1935).

On modern computers, it is possible to calculate an optimal color solid with great precision in seconds. Usually, only the MacAdam limits (the optimal colors, the boundary of the optimal color solid) are computed, because all the other (non-optimal) possible surface colors exist inside the boundary.

== Color volume ==
Color volume of the sRGB gamut plotted within CIE xyY color space

A color volume is the set of all available colors at all available hue, saturation, lightness and/or brightness, especially when referring to a specific gamut. It can be thought as the result of the combiantion of a 2D color gamut (that represents all available chromaticities) with the dynamic range of all available values of lightness or of brightness.

The term has been used to describe HDR's higher color volume than SDR with a peak brightness of at least 1,000 cd/m^{2}, higher than SDR's 100 cd/m^{2} limit; and wider color gamut than Rec. 709 / sRGB (generally DCI-P3 or Rec. 2020).

== Usage ==
The color solid can also be used to clearly visualize the volume or gamut of a screen, printer, the human eye, etc, because it gives information about the dimension of lightness, whilst the commonly used chromaticity diagram lacks this dimension of color.

Artists and art critics find the color solid to be a useful means of organizing the three variables of color—hue, lightness (or value), and saturation (or chroma), as modeled in the HCL and HSL color models—in a single schematic, using it as an aid in the composition and analysis of visual art.

== Gallery ==
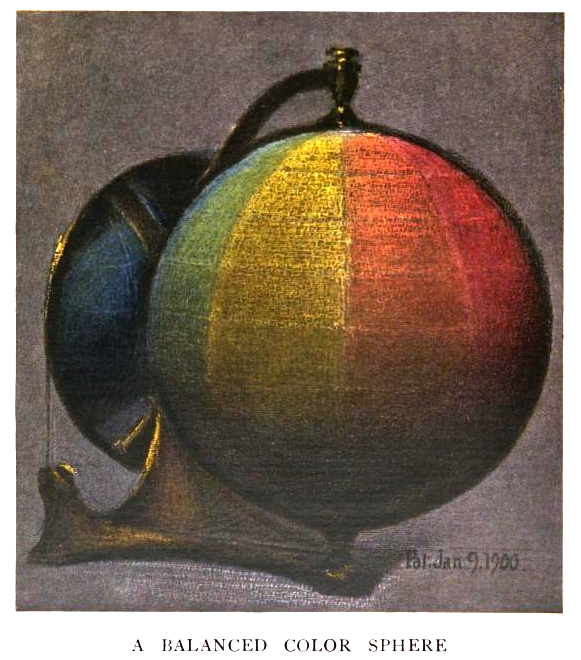
Exterior view of color sphere of Albert Henry Munsell, 1900. This is actually a drawing of a physical model that was manufactured and sold.

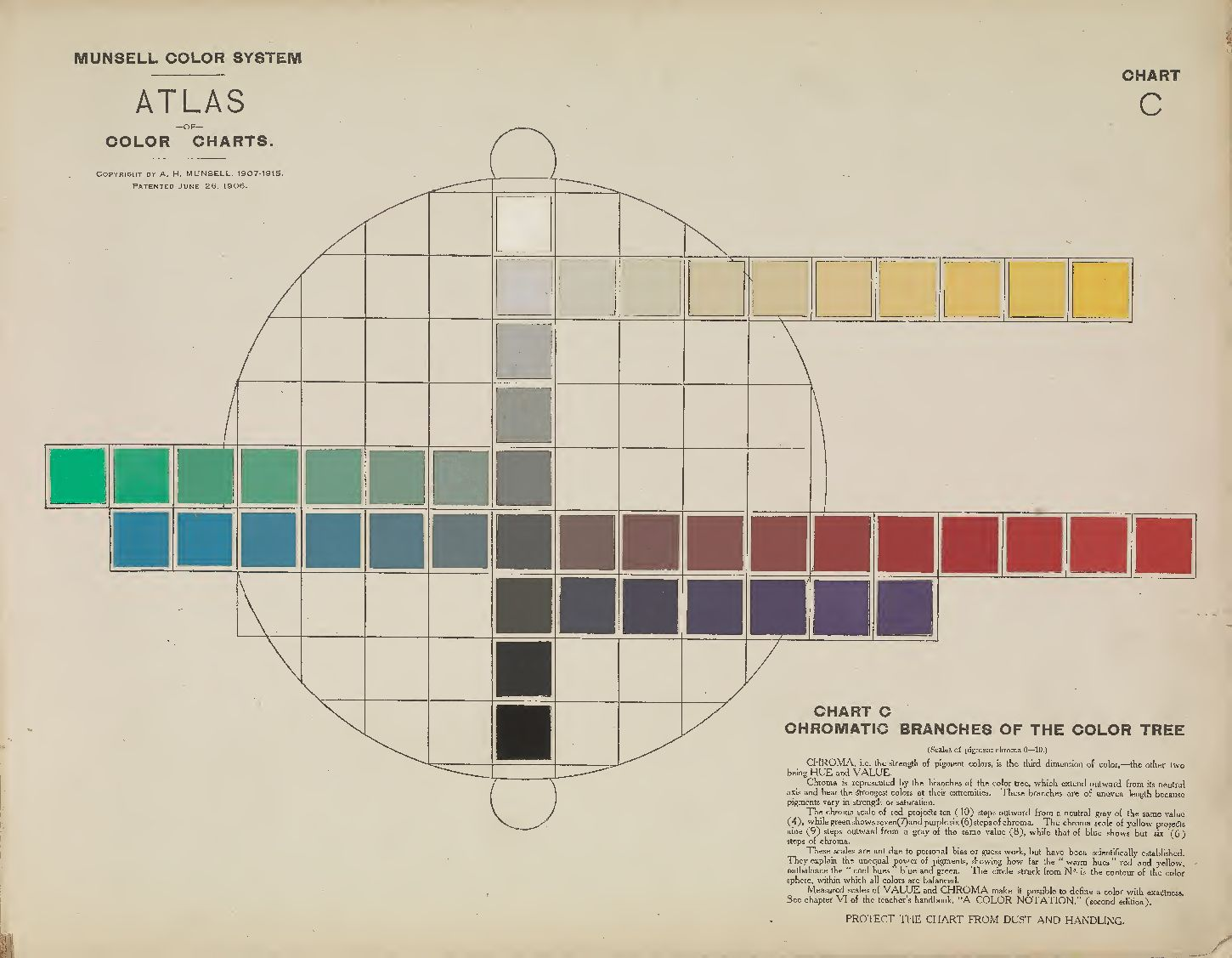
Interior cross section of Munsell's color sphere and color tree, 1915. Munsell was the first known person that separated hue, value, and chroma into perceptually uniform and independent dimensions, and he was the first to illustrate the colors systematically in three-dimensional space.

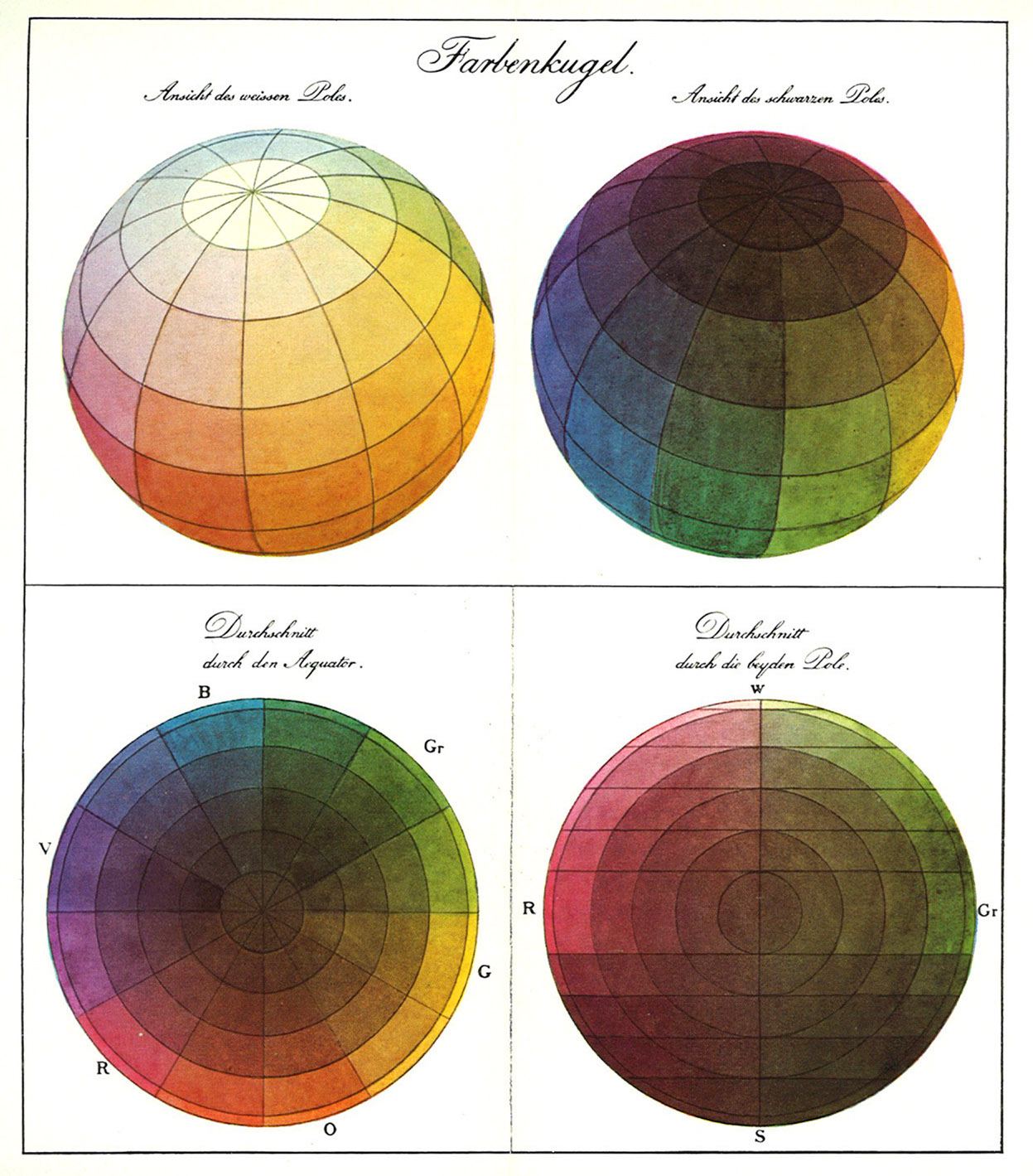
Philipp Otto Runge’s Farbenkugel (color sphere), 1810, showing the surface of the sphere (top two images), and horizontal and vertical cross sections (bottom two images)

Color sphere of Johannes Itten, 1919–20. A much clearer representation of his model appears in The Art of Color, 1961, which cannot be reproduced here for copyright reasons.

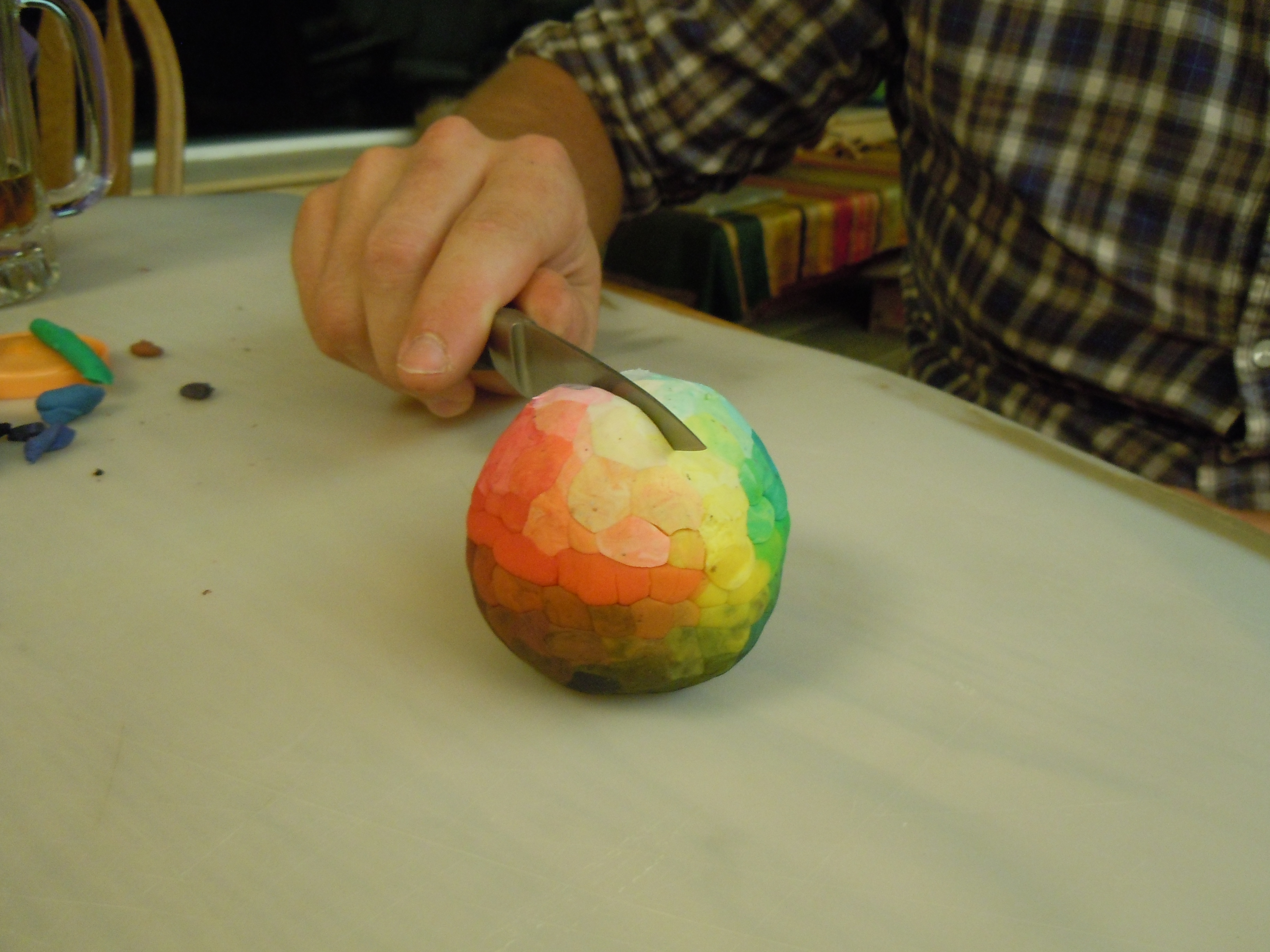
Color sphere modeled in salt dough by Jesse Hensel, 2011

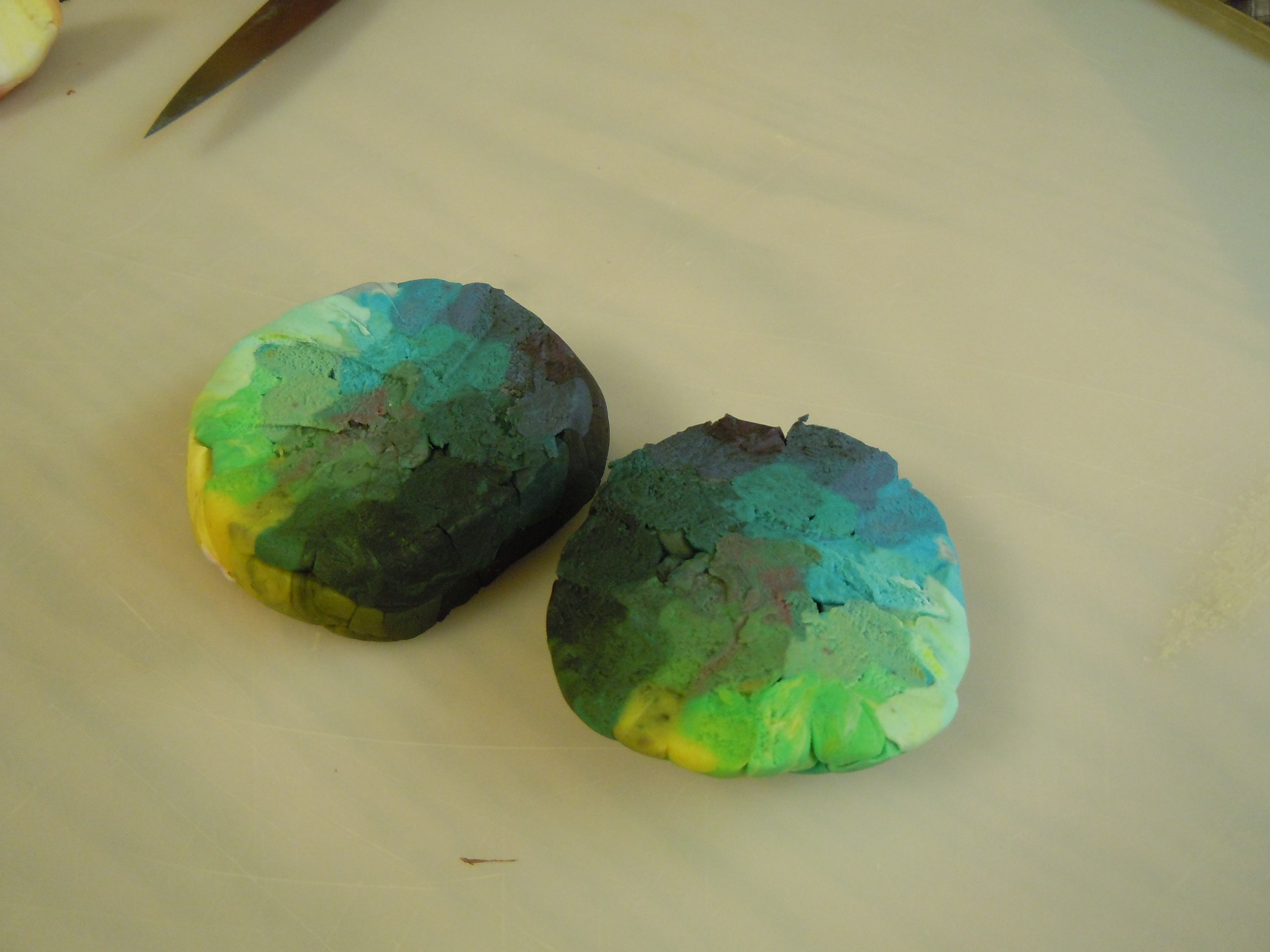
Section of Hensel's sphere revealing some of the desaturated colors

== See also ==
- Color model
- Color triangle
- Color wheel
