= Munsell color system =

Color space

The Munsell color system, showing: a circle of hues at value 5 chroma 6; the neutral values from 0 to 10; and the chromas of purple-blue (5PB) at value 5.

The Munsell color system is a color space that specifies colors based on three properties of color: hue (basic color), value (lightness), and chroma (color intensity). It was created by Albert H. Munsell in the first decade of the 20th century and adopted by the United States Department of Agriculture (USDA) as the official color system for soil research in the 1930s.

Several earlier color order systems in the field of colorimetry had placed colors into a three-dimensional color solid of one form or another, but Munsell was the first to separate hue, value, and chroma into perceptually uniform and independent dimensions, and he was the first to illustrate the colors systematically in three-dimensional space. Munsell's system, particularly the later renotations, is based on rigorous measurements of human subjects' visual responses to color, putting it on a firm experimental scientific basis. Because of this basis in human visual perception, Munsell's system has outlasted its contemporary color models, and though it has been superseded for some uses by models such as CIELAB (L*a*b*) and CIECAM02, it is still in wide use today.

== Explanation ==
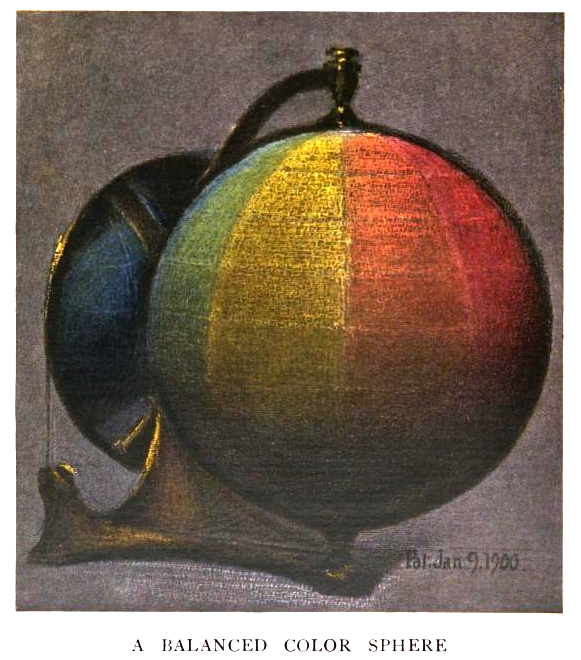
Munsell's color sphere, 1900. Later, Munsell discovered that if hue, value, and chroma were to be kept perceptually uniform, achievable surface colors could not be forced into a regular geometric shape.

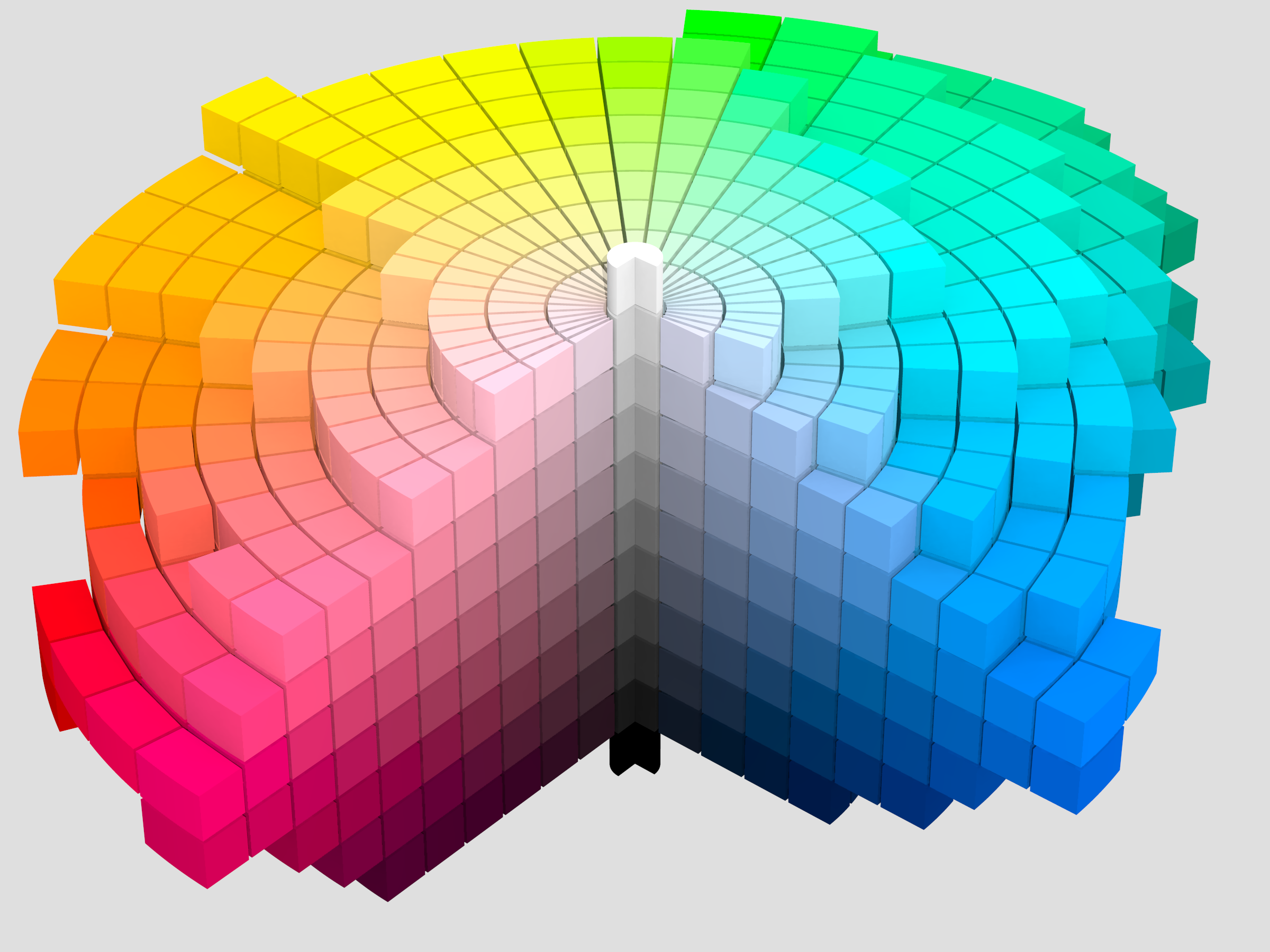
Three-dimensional representation of the 1943 Munsell renotations (with portion cut away). Notice the irregularity of the shape when compared with Munsell's earlier color sphere.

The system consists of three independent properties of color which can be represented cylindrically in three dimensions as an irregular color solid:

- hue, measured by degrees around horizontal circles
- chroma, measured radially outward from the neutral (gray) vertical axis
- value, measured vertically on the core cylinder from 0 (black) to 10 (white)

Munsell determined the spacing of colors along these dimensions by taking measurements of human visual responses. In each dimension, Munsell colors are as close to perceptually uniform as he could make them, which makes the resulting shape quite irregular. As Munsell explains:

Desire to fit a chosen contour, such as the pyramid, cone, cylinder or cube, coupled with a lack of proper tests, has led to many distorted statements of color relations, and it becomes evident, when physical measurement of pigment values and chromas is studied, that no regular contour will serve.

— Albert H. Munsell, "A Pigment Color System and Notation"

=== Hue ===
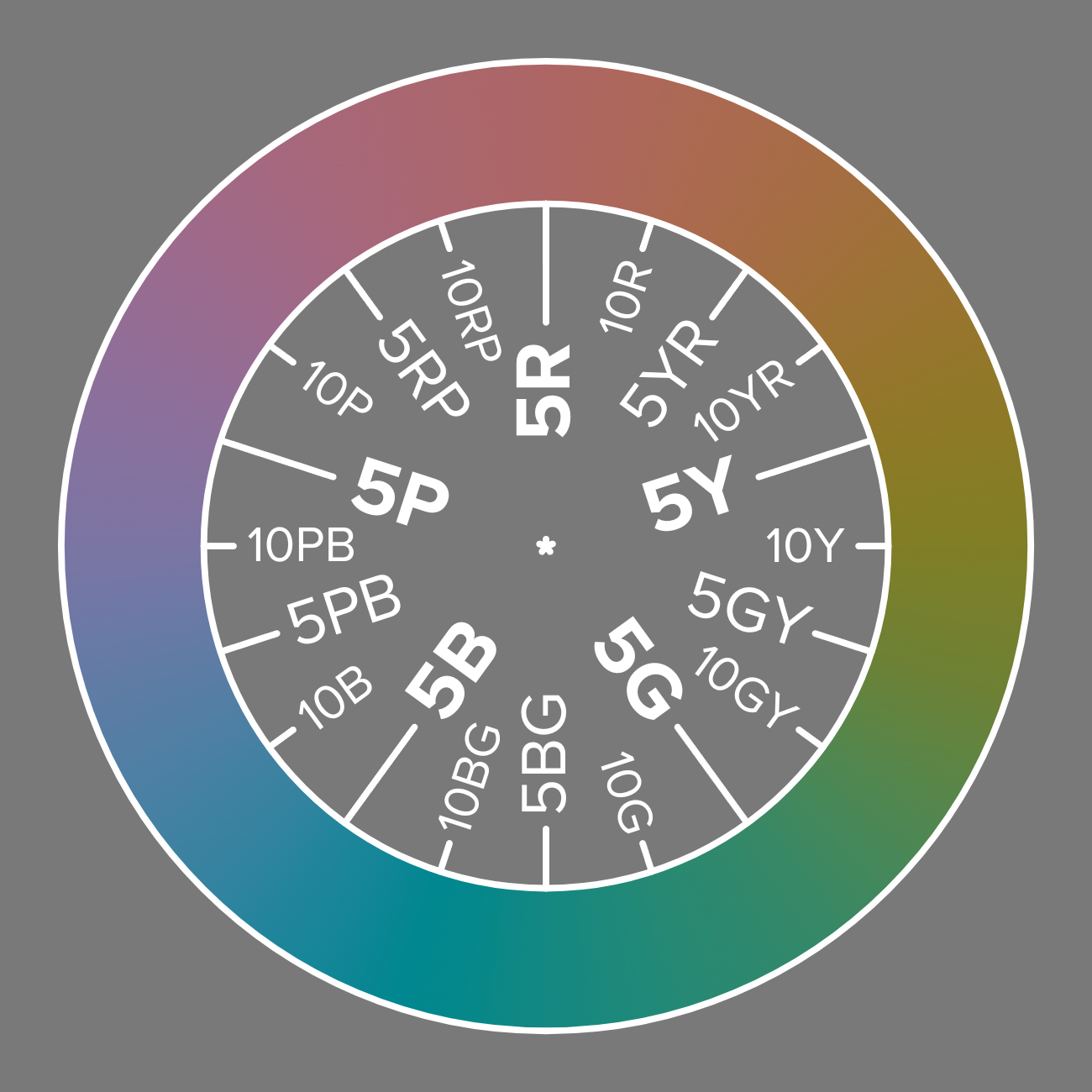
Gradient Munsell hue wheel at value 5 and constant chroma (6.24)

Since the first rendition of the Munsell color system, each horizontal circle is divided into five principal hues: Red, Yellow, Green, Blue, and Purple, along with 5 intermediate hues between adjacent principal hues: YR, GY, BG, PB, and RP. Despite trichromatic color being best described with 3 primary colors or 4 unique hues, Munsell chose to define his color space with 5 principal hues to keep it decimalized. Munsell describes the intermediate hues as orange, grass green, peacock blue, violet and plum, but opts to simplify the notation with the portmanteaus of the principal colors for the sake of intuition.

In later renditions, these 10 principal and intermediate colors were further subdivided into 10 steps each, so that at least 100 hues are definable. The sub-steps are numbered 1 to 10, which prepends the hue letter(s), e.g. 8GY. However, further subdivisions are possible through interpolation, e.g. 8.7GY. In practice, color charts conventionally specify 40 hues, in increments of 2.5, progressing as for example 10R to 2.5YR.

Munsell hues; value 6 / chroma 6
5R |			5YR |				5Y |				5GY |				5G |				5BG |
201 130 134	201 130 127	201 131 118	200 133 109	197 135 100	193 137 94	187 140 86	181 143 79	173 146 75	167 149 72	160 151 73	151 154 78	141 156 85	127 159 98	115 160 110	101 162 124	92 163 134	87 163 141	82 163 148	78 163 154	73 163 162
5BG |			5B |				5PB |				5P |				5RP |				5R |
73 163 162	70 162 170	70 161 177	73 160 184	82 158 189	93 156 193	104 154 195	117 151 197	128 149 198	141 145 198	152 142 196	160 140 193	168 138 189	177 135 182	183 134 176	188 132 169	193 131 160	196 130 153	198 130 146	200 130 140	201 130 134

=== Value ===
Value, or lightness, varies vertically along the color solid, from black (value 0) at the bottom, to white (value 10) at the top. Neutral grays lie along the vertical axis between black and white.

Several color solids before Munsell's plotted luminosity from black on the bottom to white on the top, with a gray gradient between them, but these systems neglected to keep perceptual lightness constant across horizontal slices. Instead, they plotted fully saturated yellow (light), and fully saturated blue and purple (dark) along the equator.

=== Chroma ===
Chroma, measured radially from the center of each slice, represents the "purity" of a color (related to saturation), with lower chroma being less pure (more washed out, as in pastels). There is no intrinsic upper limit to chroma. Different areas of the color space have different maximal chroma coordinates. For instance light yellow colors have considerably more potential chroma than light purples, due to the nature of the eye and the physics of color stimuli. This led to a wide range of possible chroma levels—up to the high 30s for some hue–value combinations (though it is difficult or impossible to make physical objects in colors of such high chromas, and they cannot be reproduced on current computer displays). Vivid solid colors are in the range of approximately 8.

Munsell value (vertical) and chroma (horizontal); hue 5Y and 5PB
	12	10	8	6	4	2	0	2	4	6	8	10	12
10							255 255 255
9						228 228 250	232 232 232	243 227 207	250 227 178
8					190 201 239	200 200 222	203 203 203	215 200 181	221 200 154	227 200 126	233 199 97	237 199 63
7			142 176 241	154 175 225	164 175 210	173 174 195	179 179 179	188 173 155	194 173 128	200 173 101	205 172 72	210 172 29
6	79 150 244	101 150 227	116 149 213	128 149 198	138 148 182	146 148 168	150 150 150	161 147 129	167 147 103	173 146 75	178 146 42
5	46 124 214	72 123 199	89 123 185	101 123 171	111 122 156	120 122 142	124 124 124	134 121 103	141 121 77	146 120 48	150 119 9
4		38 97 172	59 97 158	74 97 144	85 96 130	93 96 116	97 97 97	108 96 77	114 95 52	119 94 25
3			26 72 133	45 72 120	58 72 106	67 72 92	70 70 70	81 71 55	87 70 33
2				20 49 93	35 49 79	44 49 66	48 48 48	57 48 34	63 47 6
1	5PB				13 28 56	23 28 45	28 28 28	37 27 9			5Y
0							0 0 0

The Munsell Book of Color contains more color samples than this chart for both 5PB and 5Y (particularly bright yellows, up to 5Y 8.5/14). However, they are not reproducible in the sRGB color space, which has a limited color gamut designed to match that of televisions and computer displays. There are no samples for values 0 (pure black) and 10 (pure white), which are theoretical limits not reachable in pigment, and no printed samples of value 1.

=== Specifying a color ===
A color is fully specified by listing the three numbers for hue, value, and chroma in that order. For instance, a purple of medium lightness and fairly saturated would be 5P 5/10 with 5P meaning the color in the middle of the purple hue band, 5/ meaning medium value (lightness), and a chroma of 10 (see swatch). An achromatic color is specified by the syntax N V/. For example, a medium grey is specified by "N 5/".

In computer processing, the Munsell colors are converted to a set of "HVC" numbers. The V and C are the same as the normal chroma and value. The H (hue) number is converted by mapping the hue rings into numbers between 0 and 100, where both 0 and 100 correspond to 10RP.

As the Munsell books, including the 1943 renotation, only contains colors for some points in the Munsell space, it is non-trivial to specify an arbitrary color in Munsell space. Interpolation must be used to assign meanings to non-book colors such as "2.8Y 6.95/2.3", followed by an inversion of the fitted Munsell-to-xyY transform. The ASTM has defined a method in 2008, but Centore 2012 is known to work better.

== History and influence ==
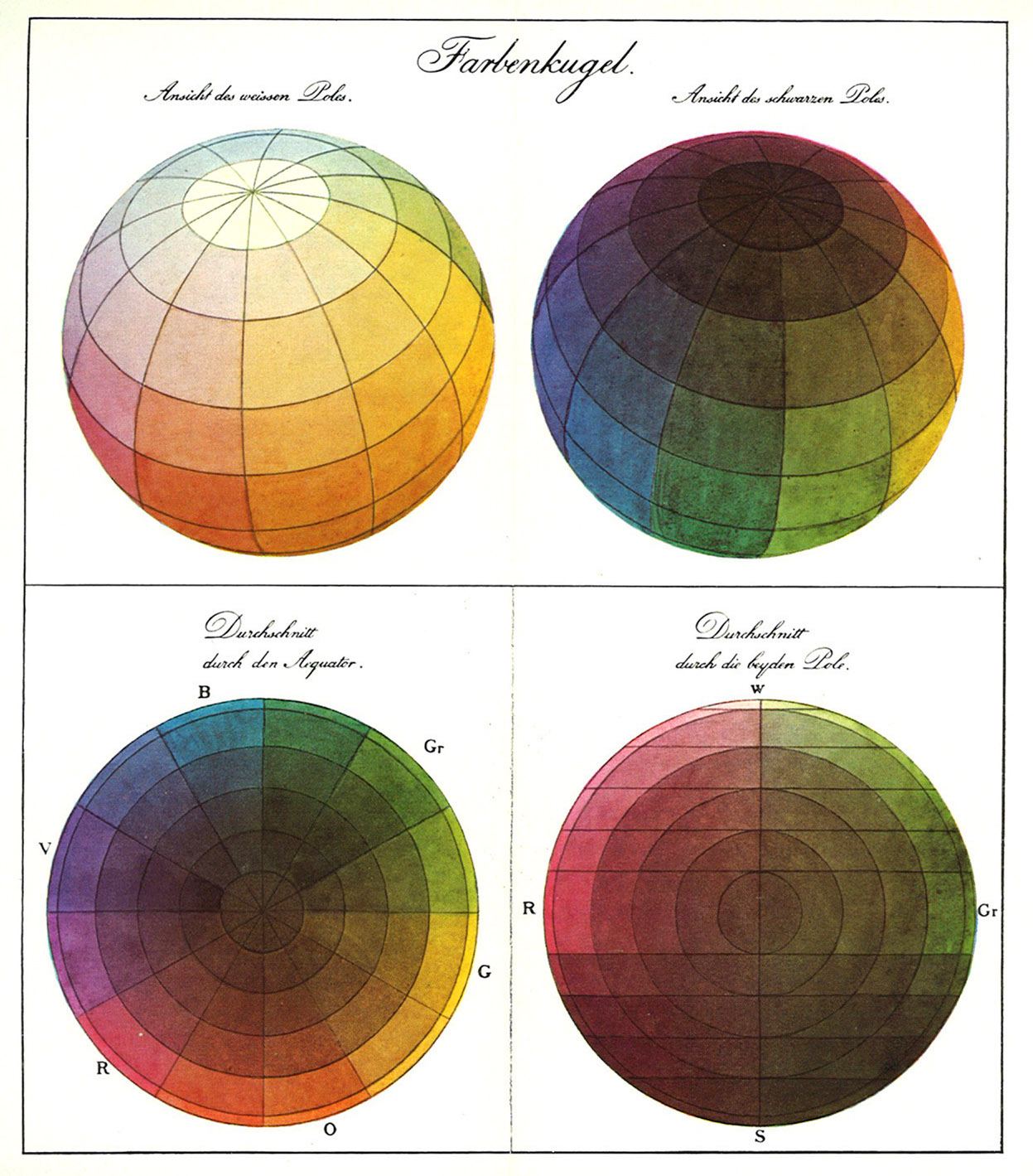
Runge's Farbenkugel (Color Sphere), 1810 (Note: There are mathematical issues with this depiction: If one calls the concentric rings "chroma" and the horizontal stripes "lightness", then it is not possible to have a color whose "chroma" is 2 (counting from the center outward) and "lightness" is 9 (counting from the bottom to the top). This means that each color cannot be uniquely identified by a single set of "hue", "lightness" and "chroma" values. Albert Munsell's color sphere was designed in such a way as to avoid this pitfall, however.)

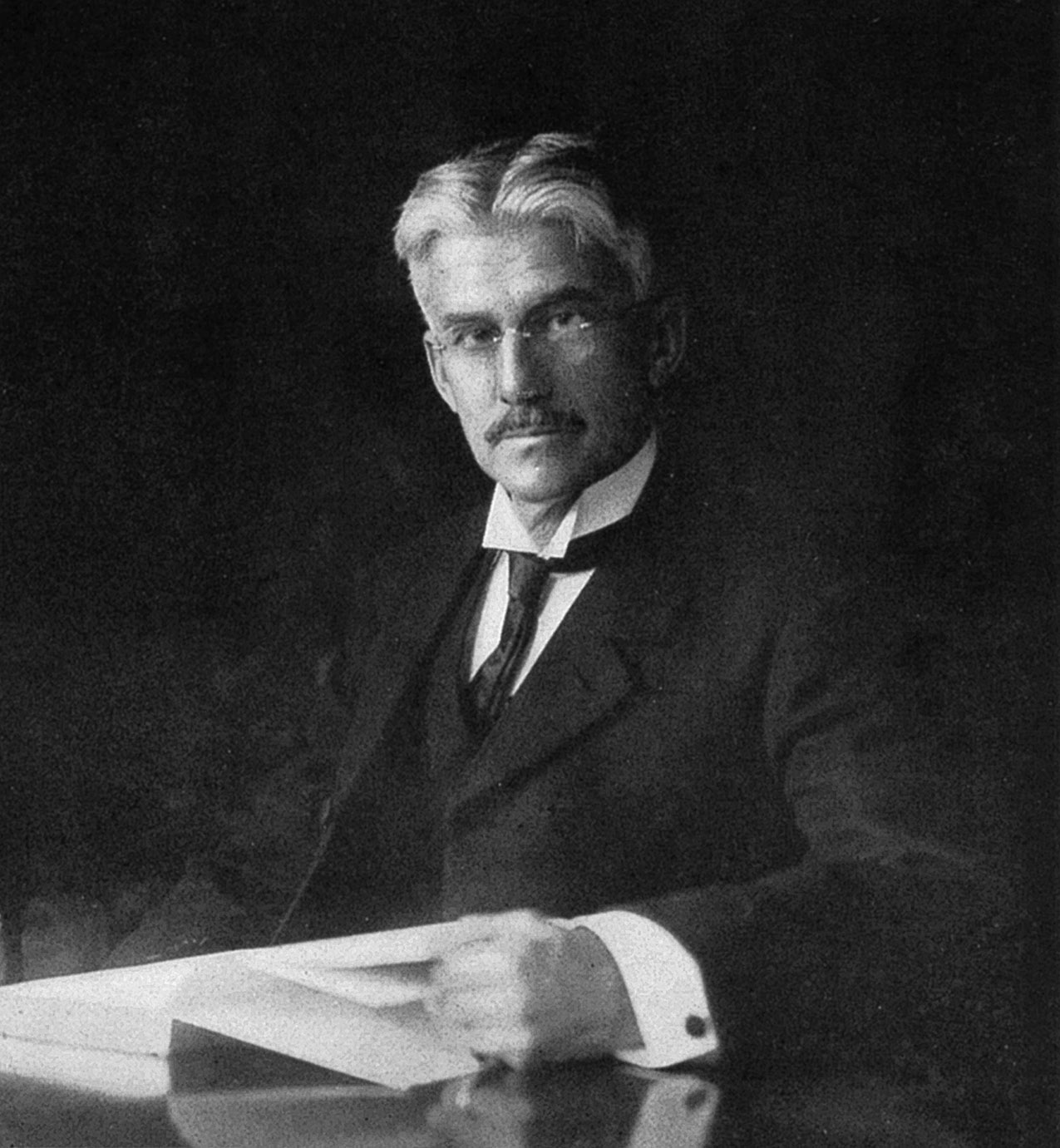
Albert H. Munsell

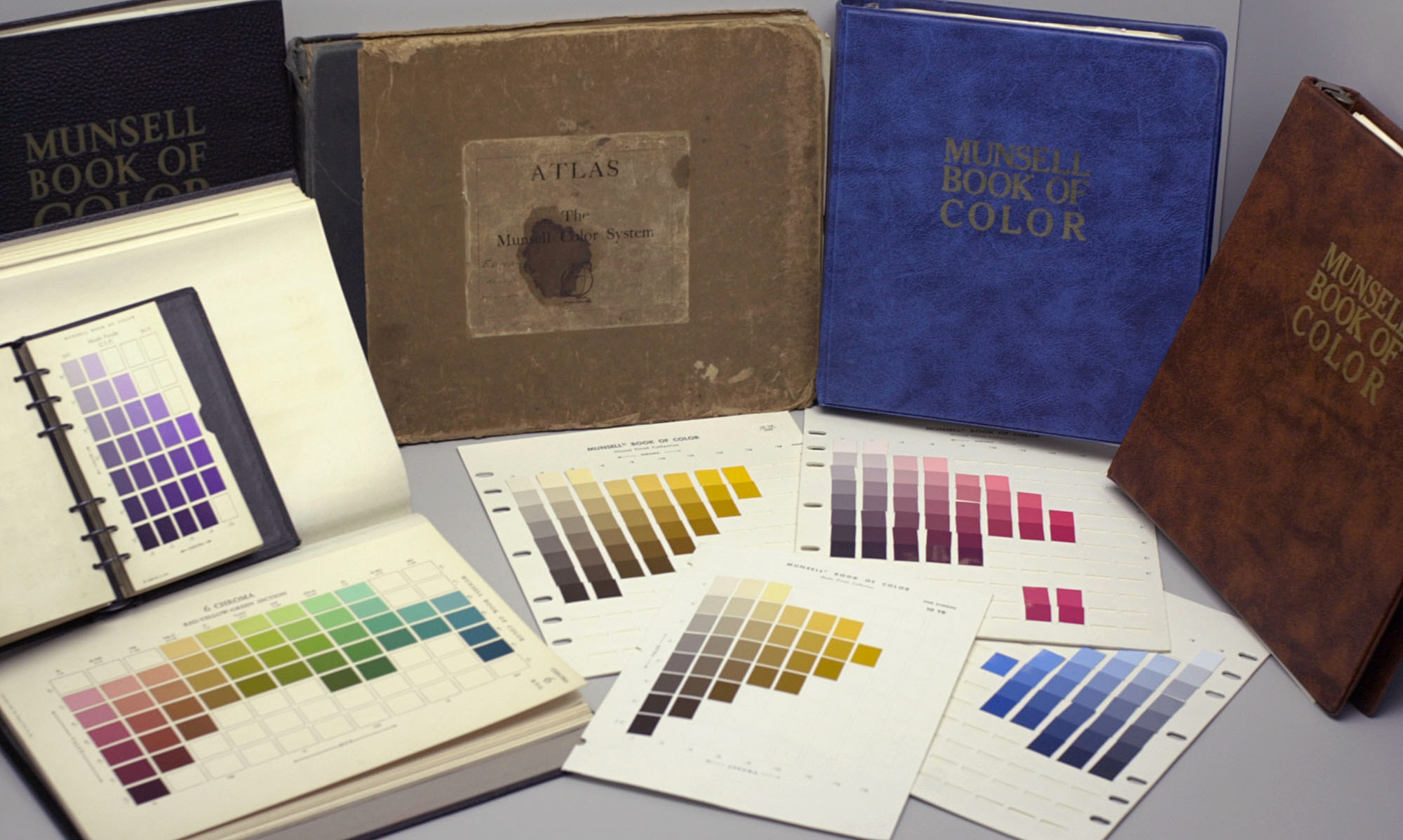
Several editions of the Munsell Book of Color. The atlas is arranged into removable pages of color swatches of varying value and chroma for each of 40 particular hues.

The idea of using a three-dimensional color solid to represent all colors was developed during the 18th and 19th centuries. Several different shapes for such a solid were proposed, including: a double triangular pyramid by Tobias Mayer in 1758, a single triangular pyramid by Johann Heinrich Lambert in 1772, a sphere by Philipp Otto Runge in 1810, a hemisphere by Michel Eugène Chevreul in 1839, a cone by Hermann von Helmholtz in 1860, a tilted cube by William Benson in 1868, and a slanted double cone by August Kirschmann in 1895. These systems became progressively more sophisticated, with Kirschmann's even recognizing the difference in value between bright colors of different hues. But all of them remained either purely theoretical or encountered practical problems in accommodating all colors. Furthermore, none was based on any rigorous scientific measurement of human vision; before Munsell, the relationship between hue, value, and chroma was not understood.

Albert Munsell, an artist and professor of art at the Massachusetts Normal Art School (now Massachusetts College of Art and Design, or MassArt), wanted to create a "rational way to describe color" that would use decimal notation instead of color names (which he felt were "foolish" and "misleading"), which he could use to teach his students about color. He first started work on the system in 1898 and published it in full form in A Color Notation in 1905.

The original embodiment of the system (the 1905 Atlas) had some deficiencies as a physical representation of the theoretical system. These were improved significantly in the 1929 Munsell Book of Color and through an extensive series of experiments carried out by the Optical Society of America in the 1940s resulting in the notations (sample definitions) for the modern Munsell Book of Color. Though several replacements for the Munsell system have been invented, building on Munsell's foundational ideas—including the Optical Society of America's Uniform Color Scales, and the International Commission on Illumination's CIELAB (L*a*b*) and CIECAM02 color models—the Munsell system is still widely used, by, among others, ANSI to define skin color and hair color for forensic pathology, the USGS for matching soil color, in prosthodontics during the selection of tooth color for dental restorations, and breweries for matching beer color. (Note: Beer color is measured in Degrees Lovibond, a metric based on the Munsell system)

The original Munsell color chart remains useful for comparing computer models of human color vision.

== See also ==
- Coloroid
- HSL and HSV
- Natural Color System

== Bibliography ==
- Cleland, Thomas M. (1921). A practical description of the Munsell color system, with suggestions for its use. Boston: Munsell Color Company. One of the first books about the Munsell color system, explaining the intuition behind its three dimensions, and suggesting possible uses of the system in picking color combinations. An edited version can be found at http://www.applepainter.com/.
- Kuehni, Rolf G. (February 2002). "The early development of the Munsell system". Color Research and Application. 27 (1): 20–27. doi:10.1002/col.10002. A description of color systems leading up to Munsell's, and a biographical explanation of Munsell's changing ideas about color and development of his color solid, leading up to the publication of A Color Notation in 1905.
- Landa, Edward R.; Fairchild, Mark D. (September–October 2005). "Charting Color from the Eye of the Beholder" (PDF). American Scientist. 93 (5): 436–443. CiteSeerX 10.1.1.77.9634. doi:10.1511/2005.5.436. An introductory explanation of the development and influence of the Munsell system.
- MacEvoy, Bruce (2005-08-01). "Modern Color Models – Munsell Color System". Color Vision. A concise introduction to the Munsell color system, on a web page which also discusses several other color systems, putting the Munsell system in its historical context.
- Munsell, Albert H. (1905). A Color Notation. Boston: G. H. Ellis Co. Munsell's original description of his system. A Color Notation was published before he had established the irregular shape of a perceptual color solid, so it describes colors positioned in a sphere.
- Munsell, Albert H. (January 1912). "A Pigment Color System and Notation". The American Journal of Psychology. 23 (2): 236–244. doi:10.2307/1412843. JSTOR 1412843. Munsell's description of his color system, from a lecture to the American Psychological Association.
- Nickerson, Dorothy (1976). "History of the Munsell color system, company, and foundation". Color Research and Application. 1 (1): 7–10.
