= Albert Henry Munsell =

American painter and color theorist (1858–1918)

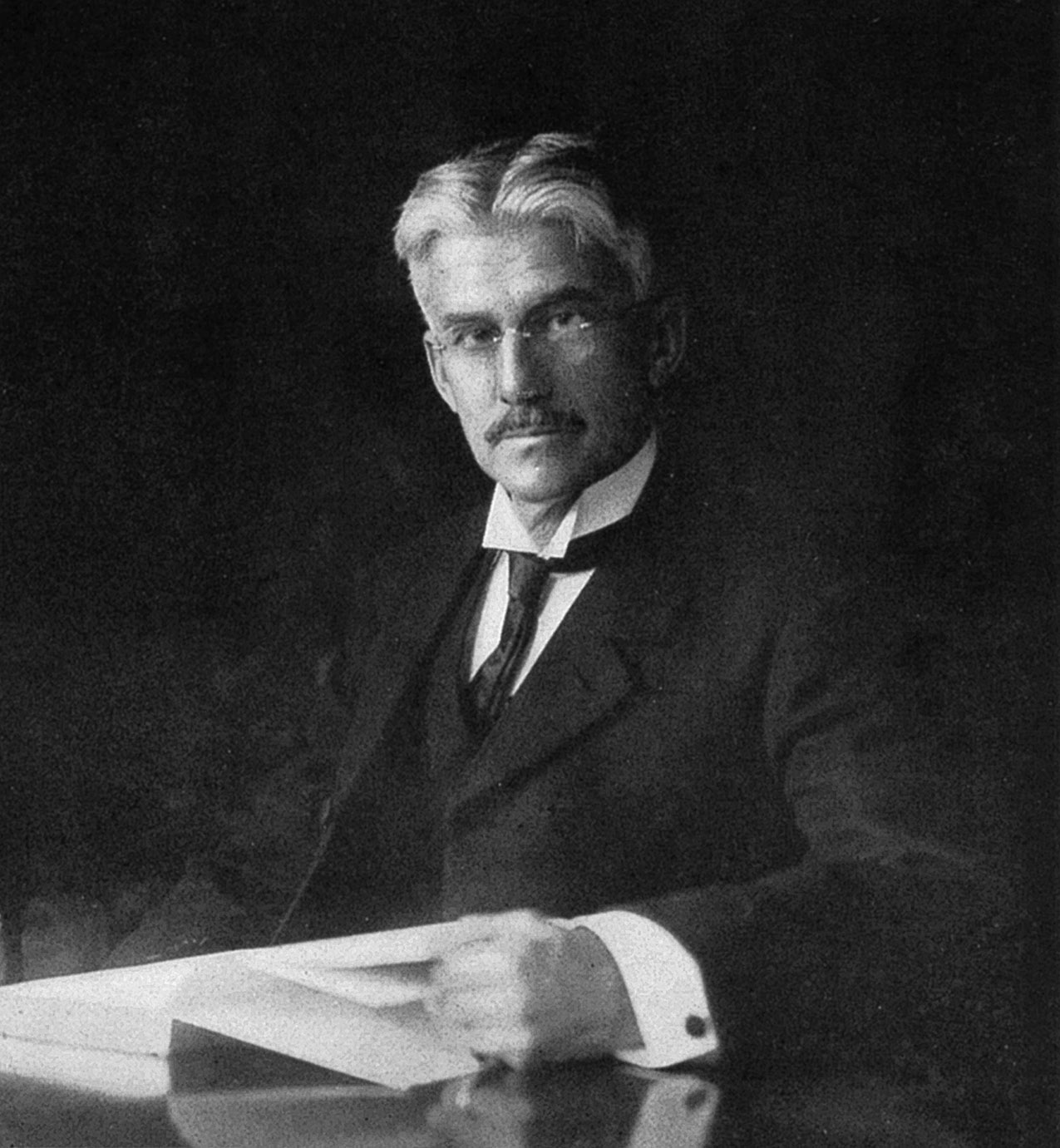
- Photograph of Munsell from A Color Notation
- Born: January 6, 1858; Boston, Massachusetts, U.S.
- Died: June 28, 1918 (aged 60); Brookline, Massachusetts, U.S.
- Occupations: painter, art teacher, inventor
- Known for: Munsell color system

Albert Henry Munsell (January 6, 1858 – June 28, 1918) was an American painter, teacher of art, and the inventor of the Munsell color system.

He was born in Boston, Massachusetts, attended and served on the faculty of Massachusetts Normal Art School, and died in nearby Brookline.

As a painter, he was noted for seascapes and portraits.

Munsell is famous for inventing the Munsell color system, an early attempt at creating an accurate system for numerically describing colors. He wrote three books about it: A Color Notation (1905), Atlas of the Munsell Color System (1915) and one published posthumously, A Grammar of Color: Arrangements of Strathmore Papers in a Variety of Printed Color Combinations According to The Munsell Color System (1921). The Munsell color order system has gained international acceptance and has served as the foundation for many color order systems, including CIELAB. In 1917, he founded the Munsell Color Company.

== Biography ==
Albert Henry Munsell is best known for his contributions in Color Science and his Color Theory, which led to one of the first Color Order Systems, the Munsell color system. He was born on January 6, 1858, in Boston. He went on to graduate from the Massachusetts Normal Art School, later named the Massachusetts College of Art and Design. He was hired by the Normal Art School as an instructor, where he lectured about Color Composition and Artistic Anatomy. In 1905, Munsell published his book, A Color Notation which described his new Color Theory. Later, he published his book Atlas of the Color Solid which preceded the Munsell Book of Color. The Munsell Book of Color described his color order system and was the first to include actual samples of the colors in the system. Munsell spent most of his later life traveling around Europe to present his work to painters and scientists. Munsell's system created an important bridge between art and science. Munsell established the Munsell Color Company in 1917. He died shortly after on June 28, 1918.

== Munsell color theory ==
During his study of color, Munsell realized the need for an organized way of defining colors. He wanted to create a system that had a meaningful notation of color, rather than just color names that he found were "foolish" and "misleading". He set out to create his color space in 1898. To do this, he used his unique inventions to help make measurements to organize his system. One of these inventions was the photometer. This device measured the luminance of an object, and Munsell used this to make measurements of different colors and to help define how color changes. This information would later become his three dimensions of color. He also patented an invention called the "Spinning Top". This device was similar to the rotating color wheel developed by James Maxwell, where several colors were placed on the top and the top was spun, mixing the colors together. Munsell used this device to measure the relationship between chroma and value, which helped him create templates for each step in chroma and value for every hue. With these tools, Munsell was able to define three dimensions that define color. He also paid close attention to the sensitivity of the human visual system, and considered this when creating the steps between colors in his system, particularly his value scale. He called these dimensions Hue, Value, and Chroma.

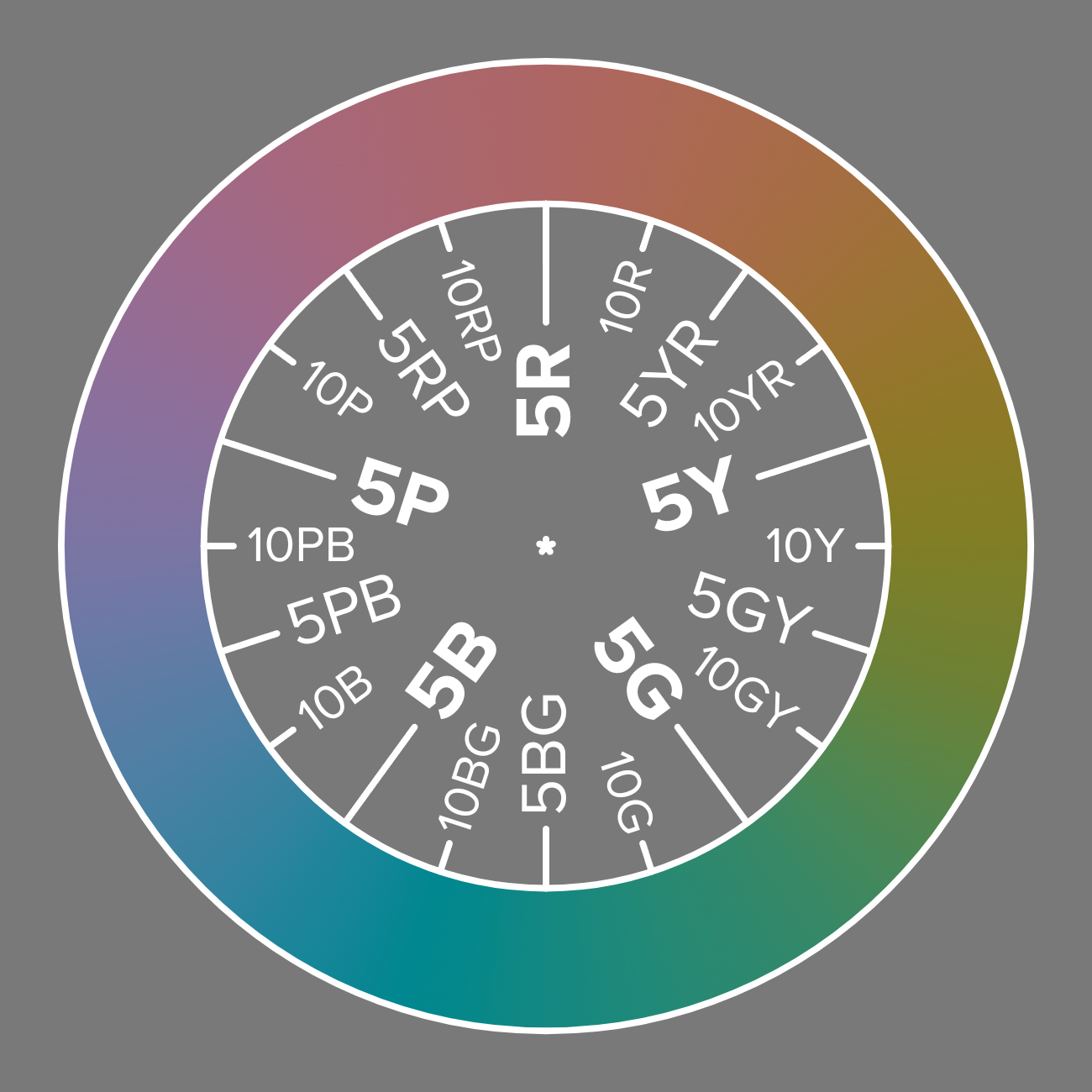
Gradient Munsell hue wheel at value 5 and constant chroma (6.24)

Munsell Hue is the attribute of color by which we distinguish red from green, blue from yellow, and other colors. Munsell chose several colors to be the principal hues. These are Red, Yellow, Green, Blue, and Purple. These hues were arranged in a circle. Each hue can be mixed with the same amount of the neighboring hues to create intermediate hues: yellow-red, green-yellow, blue-green, purple-blue, and red-purple. Each color can be defined by how much of each principal hue it contains. A color that is composed of just a principal hue would be given a number 5. So, the red primary would be given the number 5R. If you move to the left of the red hue, the number increases, with the color exactly in between red and yellow-red defined as 10R. Continuing around the circle, the number of the color goes back down to 1YR right after 10 red, until the color is composed of just the yellow-red primary, in which case the color would be 10YR. So, the number represents how much of the primary hue the color contains.

Munsell Value defines the lightness of a color, or how much black or white the color contains. The neutral color scale, from black to white with neutral greys in between, all have a hue of 0, which means they do not contain any hue. Instead these colors only change in value. Black would have a value of 0N, with N designating value. White would have a value of 10N, and middle grey would have a value of 5N. A grey in between middle grey and black would have a value of 2.5N. This value scale is based upon visual experiments. The middle grey is visual perceived to have equal amounts of black and white, and so on for other greys. It was very important for Munsell to create a system that was based on the human visual response to color.

The final dimension created was chroma. Before the Munsell color theory, chroma was not a term used in the art or scientific community. Instead, the intensity of color was defined as saturation. However, Munsell felt it appropriate to break up saturation into two different dimensions, namely value and chroma. Chroma defines the difference between a pure hue and a pure grey. So, a color with a chroma of 1 would be very close to a grey. The maximum chroma of a color is defined by the hue of the color. For example, a color with a yellow hue will have less chroma values than a color with purple hue. This is because of the human visual sensitivity to different hues. Again, this shows how the human visual system is modeled through the Munsell color theory.

With each of the dimensions defined, it is possible to distinguish a color based on its Munsell Notation. Take for example the color 2.5YR 3/4. This color is between red and yellow-red, but closer to yellow-red, has a value of 3 which is closer to black, and has a chroma of 4.

Munsell also wanted to create a standard way of measuring and viewing color. To do this, he investigated the relationship between the color and the light source used for illumination. In short, he found that the light source used drastically effected the color perceived. To help in this investigation, Munsell visited the Edison Light Company. He eventually developed the standard for daylight viewing of colors for accurate color evaluation.

== Munsell color order system ==
To help display and organize his color theory, Munsell created the Munsell color system. It is set up to organize each color by the color's hue, value, and chroma. Each dimension of a color can be changed independently of the other dimensions. This helped Munsell organize the colors in a three-dimensional space, known as the Munsell Color Space. To create this space, Munsell first took the neutral colors, and aligned them vertically, with black on the bottom and white on the top. In between, the neutral greys were spaced out in equal visual intervals. So, as one moves up in the space, the value of each row increases. Next, Munsell organized the chroma as increasing away from the center. So as one gets farther away from the center, the chroma increases. The hue is positioned at different angles protruding away from the center neutral colors. The distance between each color was visually uniform, because the system was derived from vigorous testing of the human visual response to color. This arrangement turned out to be known as the Munsell color tree.

This image shows the Munsell Color space and the orientation of the hue, value, and chroma dimensions.

By organizing the Munsell color system in this way, the Munsell tree has many advantages. One advantage is that the system is designed for new colors to be added. If the spacing between two colors is too large, an intermediate color can be placed in between those two colors. What is important is that adding new colors this way will not disturb the order of the other colors. In other words, the other colors' dimension values will not change. Another advantage of this system is that it made it very easy to communicate color. Each color is given its own values, which can be thought of as coordinates in the space. Therefore, to communicate color, the coordinates of the color can stated, and the exact color will be known. So, the Munsell color system created a standard system of color specification. It also proved to be the groundwork for many other color spaces, such as CIELab. This is because Munsell did much of the pioneering work in Color Science, and other systems expanded on what he already discovered.

However, there are some limitations to the Munsell color system. While it is handy to have a system with visual uniformly spaced colors, the space is not continuous, meaning that it has a discrete number of samples. Also, the spacing between the colors are very large, and because of this it is difficult to measure thresholds using the system, such as the just noticeable difference. These limitations inspired the CIE to develop a uniform, continuous color space for characterizing color differences. This turned out to be the CIELab color space, which was heavily influenced by the Munsell color system.

A few changes were made to the System since it was first developed. In 1943, the OSA recommended a change in the notation of the system, and these changes became known as the Munsell re-notations. In 1950, the number of hues in the Munsell Book of Color doubled from 20 to 40. Then in 1958, a glossy version of the Book of Color was produced in addition to the matte version already in print.

== Color education ==
One of Albert Munsell's goals in life was to standardize the way color was taught to children, particularly those in grades 4 through 9. In September and October 1904, Munsell worked with Miss Peterson, the Superintendent of Drawing for Boston, and Mr. Pritchard, master of the Everett School in Boston, to create the Color Education Primer on color theory. The Color Education Primer covered where colors come from, how they can be measured, and how they can be compared and organized. Munsell described the goals of the primer as to teach children to, "...describe a color (locates), relate the color to others, writes by a notation, names, harmonize and find them." Later, these objectives became the basis for the Munsell Book of Color. Munsell, Peterson, and Pritchard agreed on the primer to help demonstrate the "rules" of the Munsell color theory.

The Munsell color theory still stands as the basis of color education. It provides a simple, meaningful way to describe colors and organize them. Companies such as X-Rite provide color education services that are based on the Munsell color theory. These services help describe where color comes from, the basics behind how the Munsell color order system is designed, and how it can be implemented. Different resources such as books, posters, and learning kits can be found on X-Rite's website.

== Bridge between art and science ==
With his work in creating a systematic way of defining color, Albert Munsell created a necessary bridge between art and science. His color order system has enough structure to allow scientists to expand upon and use it, while being simple enough for artists with no scientific background to use it for selecting and comparing colors. Munsell's System essentially created a way of communicating color. Munsell wanted the study of color to be similar to the study of music. In music, one can simply hear a note and how it relates to other notes based on the position of the note on the staff. Munsell wanted it to be possible to see a color based on three dimensions. This would describe a color and relate that color to other colors. These dimensions were also designed so that they could be understood by artists and scientists alike. It should be observed that in creating these dimensions, Munsell used many different fields of science, such as physiology, psychology, and physics. This relates the idea to color to not only science and art, but to different fields within science as well.

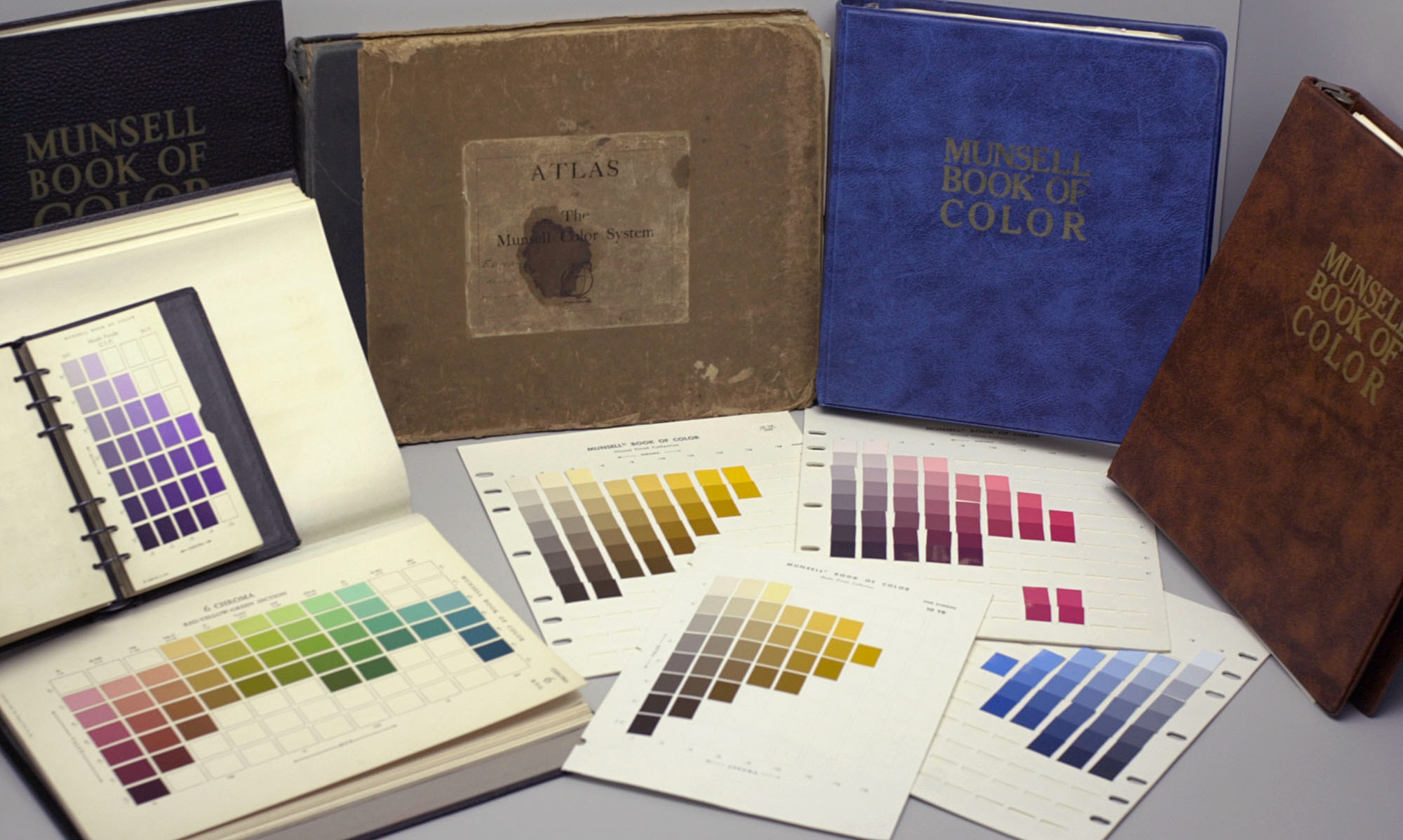
Several different editions and page selections from the Munsell Book of Color

Along with his scientific intuition, Munsell's artistic background influenced his choice of the three different dimensions to describe color. This particularly applies to chroma. Before the Munsell color system existed, the term chroma also did not exist. However, the term saturation did exist among the art community. The saturation of a color described how pure and how bright a color was. Munsell saw this as being two different dimensions, and decided to break it up into two different dimensions, chroma and value. To support his new idea of chroma, Munsell consulted several scientists on how it should be properly defined. They all agreed that chroma was a new term. One of these scientists was Dr. House from Johns Hopkins University. Munsell met with him, and described how each dimension would define color. After explaining these dimensions, Dr. House noted that Munsell's three dimensional color theory would encompass all sensations of color, and is consistent with Herring's Opponent process theory. He also noted that "the physicist is busy with spectral hues, but the physiologist, like the painter, is busy with the sensation." This again shows how art and science rely on each other in the world of color.

Munsell continued to gain support from other scientists for his new color space. He visited Harvard and MIT, and met with scientists such as Edward Charles Pickering. One collaborator, Professor Dolbear, exclaimed "(Munsell) may furnish a track across what is now a desert between practical and scientific color work."

== Munsell Color Company ==
The Munsell Color Company was established in 1917. The purpose of the company was to continue the lifelong passion of Munsell in establishing color standards using his color theory. After his death in June 1918, Munsell's son, Alexander Ector Orr Munsell, took over the company. Under Alexander's management, the company continued to improve the Munsell color system by improving the color scales in the Munsell Book of Color. However, in 1942, Alexander was forced to sell the company assets, and the Munsell Color Foundation was created. In 1983, the Foundation donated funds to Rochester Institute of Technology. This resulted in the creation of the Munsell Color Science Laboratory, which still exists. In the laboratory, research and advances in the field of Color Science continue to be made. The Munsell Color Company was bought in 1970 by Macbeth, and, after a series of mergers, acquisitions, and corporate spinoffs, is now owned by the Veralto Corporation as part of its X-Rite subsidiary.

== Patents ==
- U.S. Patent 417,831. Artist's Easel. December 1889.
- U.S. Patent 640,792. Color-Sphere and Mount. January 1900.
- U.S. Patent 686,827. Photometer. 19 November 1901.
- U.S. Patent 717,596. Spinning-Top. 6 January 1903.
- U.S. Patent 824,374. Color Chart or Scale. June 1906.

== See also ==
- CIE 1931 color space
- Photometer
- Colorimeter
- CIE Lab color space
