= Alexis Spectral Data =

Alexis Spectral Data is a software developed for colour matching processes that calculates from available spectral data the colour numbers used by computers to display colours on screen. It displays the colour for each spectral reflectance curve and records the calculated trichromatic values and colour numbers along with the spectral curves. This eliminates the need to scan the samples separately with a truecolour Scanner while creating the database. The spectral data can be introduced manually as a series of reflectance values at wavelengths measured in different standard illuminants with an arbitrary but fixed increment that must be kept for each spectral curve throughout the creation of the whole database. Therefore, older UV-VIS Spectrophotometers that can't be interfaced with computers can also be used for creating the database needed for colour matching. Alexis Spectral Data determines the whiteness degree in a less time-consuming method, which permits storage and easier handling of the obtained data.

Alexis Spectral Data can export the trichromatic values, calculated from the spectral curves, to Alexis Analyser, software that handles only trichromatic data. The earliest information about the development of this software comes from a paper published by a student at the University Politehnica Bucharest in 1993.

The software runs on Windows based computers but not on other operating systems.
