= Color temperature =

Property of light sources related to black-body radiation

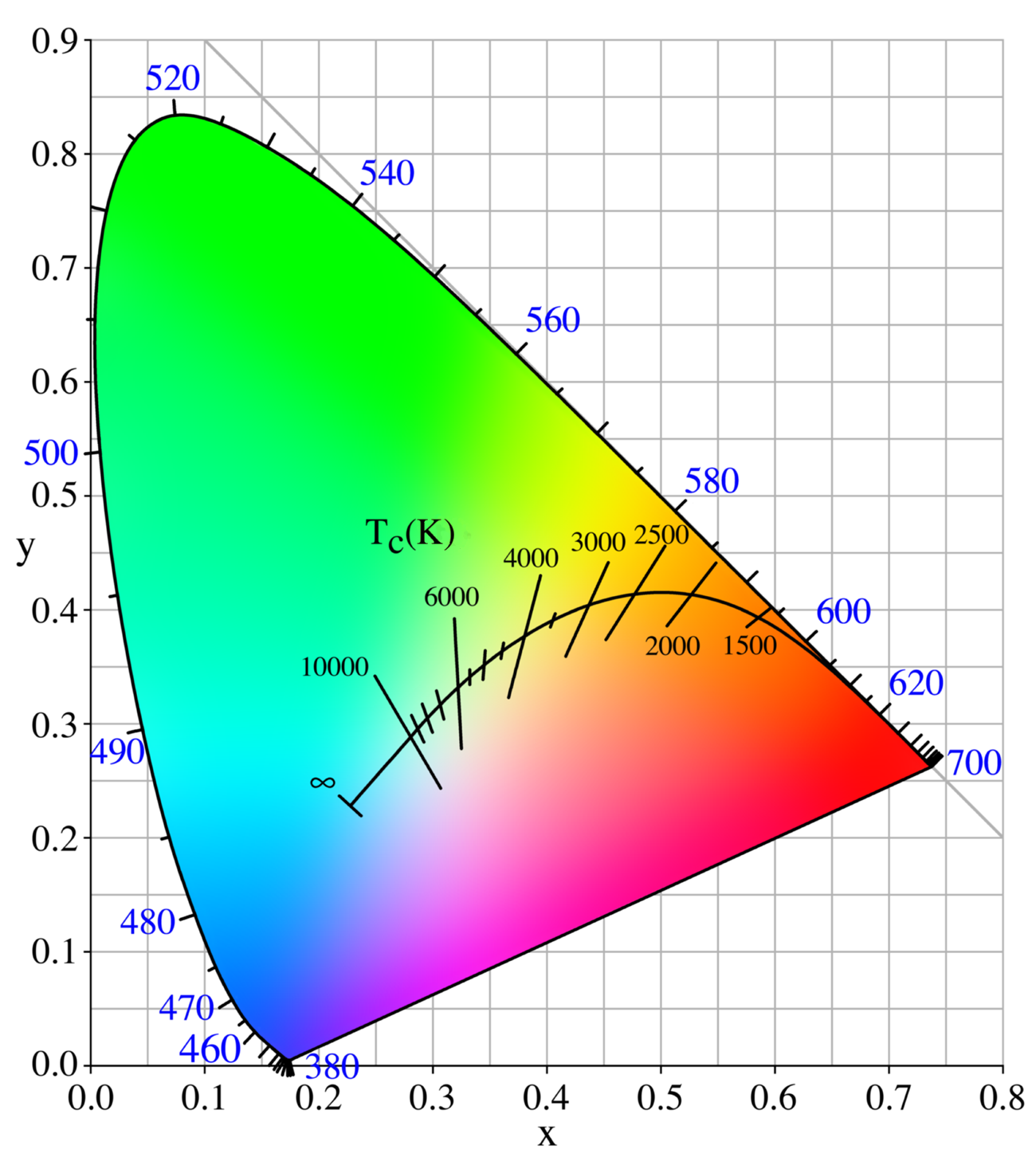
The CIE 1931 x,y chromaticity space, also showing the chromaticities of black-body light sources of various temperatures (Planckian locus), and lines of constant correlated color temperature

Color temperature is a parameter describing the color of a visible light source by comparing it to the color of light emitted by an idealized opaque, non-reflective body, known as a black body. The temperature of the ideal emitter that matches the color most closely is defined as the color temperature of the original visible light source. The color temperature scale describes only the color of light emitted by a light source, which may actually be at a different (and often much lower) temperature.

Color temperature has applications in lighting, photography, videography, publishing, manufacturing, and other fields. In practice, color temperature is most meaningful for light sources that correspond somewhat closely to the color of some black body, i.e., light in a range going from red to orange to yellow to white to bluish white. Although the concept of correlated color temperature extends the definition to any visible light, the color temperature of a green or a purple light rarely is useful information. Color temperature is conventionally expressed in kelvins, using the symbol K, which are units for absolute temperature.

== Categorizing different lighting ==
Color temperatures and example sources
Temperature	Source
1,000 K	Most commercial electric heating elements
1,700 K	Match flame, low-pressure sodium lamps (LPS/SOX)
1,850 K	Candle flame, sunset/sunrise
2,400 K	Standard incandescent lamps
2,550 K	Soft white incandescent lamps
2,700 K	"Soft white" compact fluorescent and LED lamps
3,000 K	Warm white compact fluorescent and LED lamps
3,200 K	Studio lamps, photofloods, etc.
3,350 K	Studio "CP" light
5,000 K	Horizon daylight, tubular fluorescent lamps or cool white/daylight compact fluorescent and LED lamps
5,500–6,000 K	Vertical daylight, electronic flash
6,200 K	Xenon short-arc lamp
6,500 K	Daylight, overcast, daylight LED lamps
6,500–9,500 K	LCD or CRT screens
15,000–27,000 K	Clear blue poleward sky
∞ K	Theoretical upper limit based on black-body radiation calculations
Wien ∞ K	Theoretical upper limit based on Wien's approximation law

The black-body radiance (B_{λ}) vs. wavelength (λ) curves for the visible spectrum. The vertical axes of Planck's law plots building this animation were proportionally transformed to keep equal areas between functions and horizontal axis for wavelengths 380–780 nm. K indicates the color temperature in kelvins, and M indicates the color temperature in micro reciprocal degrees.

The color temperature of the electromagnetic radiation emitted from an ideal black body is the black body's surface temperature in kelvins, or alternatively in micro reciprocal degrees (mired). This permits the definition of a standard by which light sources are compared.

If a hot surface is not an ideal black-body radiator, the color temperature of the light it emits is not the actual temperature of the surface. An incandescent lamp's light is thermal radiation, and the bulb approximates an ideal black-body radiator, so its color temperature is essentially the temperature of the filament. Thus a relatively low temperature emits a dull red and a high temperature emits the almost white of the traditional incandescent light bulb. Metal workers are able to judge the temperature of hot metals by their color, from dark red to orange-white and then white (see red heat).

Many other light sources, such as fluorescent lamps, or light emitting diodes (LEDs) emit light primarily by processes other than thermal radiation. This means that the emitted radiation does not follow the form of a black-body spectrum. These sources are assigned what is known as a correlated color temperature (CCT). CCT is the color temperature of a black-body radiator which to human color perception most closely matches the light from the lamp. Because such an approximation is not required for incandescent light, the CCT for an incandescent light is simply its unadjusted temperature, derived from comparison to a black-body radiator.

=== The Sun ===
The Sun closely approximates a black-body radiator. The effective temperature, defined by the total radiative power per square unit, is 5,772 K. The color temperature of sunlight above the atmosphere is about 5,900 K.

The Sun may appear red, orange, yellow, or white from Earth, depending on its position in the sky. The changing color of the Sun over the course of the day is mainly a result of the scattering of sunlight by the atmosphere. Rayleigh scattering of sunlight by Earth's atmosphere causes sunlight to have a lower ("warmer") color temperature in the early morning and late afternoon (the golden hours). This scattering also causes the blue color of the sky. Scattering by atmospheric particulates – an optical phenomenon called the Tyndall effect – also affects the color of daylight.

Daylight has a spectrum similar to that of a black body with a correlated color temperature between 5,500 K (daylight-balanced photographic film standard) and 6,500 K (D65 viewing standard).

Approximation of the hues of the Planckian locus as a function of the kelvin temperature, rendered with a white point near 6,500 K, not accounting for chromatic adaptation

For colors based on black-body theory, blue occurs at higher temperatures, whereas red occurs at lower temperatures. This is the opposite of the cultural associations attributed to colors, in which "red" is "hot", and "blue" is "cold".

=== Infinite temperature ===
The color of an infinitely hot blackbody.
#94b1ff

The color of an infinitely hot blackbody according to Wien's law.
#7f9fff

As the temperature of a black-body radiator approaches positive infinity, its color converges to CIE xy coordinates (0.2399, 0.2340), corresponding to an sRGB value of (148, 177, 255) or #94b1ff, a light blue color known as perano. This is because of the Rayleigh-Jeans law, which states that at frequencies much lower than the peak frequency of a black-body radiator, spectral power is inversely proportional to the fourth power of the wavelength.

Wien's approximation gives a slightly deeper color for infinite temperature, sRGB value: 127, 159, 255; HEX code: #7f9fff.

== Color theory ==
This property of illumination is distinct from artistic color theory where color temperatures over 5000 K are called "cool colors" (bluish), while lower color temperatures (2700–3000 K) are called "warm colors" (yellowish), exactly the opposite of black-body radiation. "Warm" and "cool" in this context is with respect to a traditional aesthetic association of color to warmth or coolness, not a reference to physical black body temperature. By the hue-heat hypothesis, low color temperatures psychologically evoke warmth, while high color temperatures evoke coolness. The spectral peak of warm-colored light is closer to infrared, and most natural warm-colored light sources emit significant infrared radiation. The fact that "warm" lighting in this sense actually has a "cooler" color temperature often leads to confusion.

== Applications ==
Color temperature (right) of various light sources (left)

=== Lighting ===
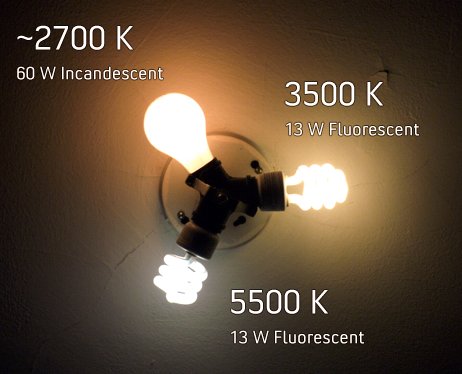
Color temperatures of common electric lamps

Graph of color temperature comfort zones.

For lighting building interiors, it is often important to take into account the color temperature of illumination. A warmer (i.e., a lower color temperature) light is often used in public areas to promote relaxation, while a cooler (higher color temperature) light is used to enhance concentration, for example in schools and offices.

CCT dimming for LED technology is regarded as a difficult task, since binning, age and temperature drift effects of LEDs change the actual color value output. Here feedback loop systems are used, for example with color sensors, to actively monitor and control the color output of multiple color mixing LEDs.

=== Aquaculture ===
In fishkeeping, color temperature has different functions and foci in the various branches.

- In freshwater aquaria, color temperature is generally of concern only for producing a more attractive display. Lights tend to be designed to produce an attractive spectrum, sometimes with secondary attention paid to keeping the plants in the aquaria alive.
- In a saltwater/reef aquarium, color temperature is an essential part of tank health. Within about 400 to 3000 nanometers, light of shorter wavelength can penetrate deeper into water than longer wavelengths, providing essential energy sources to the algae hosted in (and sustaining) coral. This is equivalent to an increase of color temperature with water depth in this spectral range. Because coral typically live in shallow water and receive intense, direct tropical sunlight, the focus was once on simulating this situation with 6500 K lights.

=== Digital photography ===
In digital photography, the term color temperature sometimes refers to remapping of color values to simulate variations in ambient color temperature. Most digital cameras and raw image software provide presets simulating specific ambient values (e.g., sunny, cloudy, tungsten, etc.) while others allow explicit entry of white balance values in kelvins. These settings vary color values along the blue–yellow axis, while some software includes additional controls (sometimes labeled "tint") adding the magenta–green axis, and are to some extent arbitrary and a matter of artistic interpretation.

=== Photographic film ===
Photographic emulsion film does not respond to lighting color identically to the human retina or visual perception. An object that appears to the observer to be white may turn out to be very blue or orange in a photograph. The color balance may need to be corrected during printing to achieve a neutral color print. The extent of this correction is limited since color film normally has three layers sensitive to different colors and when used under the "wrong" light source, every layer may not respond proportionally, giving odd color casts in the shadows, although the mid-tones may have been correctly white-balanced under the enlarger. Light sources with discontinuous spectra, such as fluorescent tubes, cannot be fully corrected in printing either, since one of the layers may barely have recorded an image at all.

Photographic film is made for specific light sources (most commonly daylight film and tungsten film), and, used properly, will create a neutral color print. Matching the sensitivity of the film to the color temperature of the light source is one way to balance color. If tungsten film is used indoors with incandescent lamps, the yellowish-orange light of the tungsten incandescent lamps will appear as white (3200 K) in the photograph. Color negative film is almost always daylight-balanced, since it is assumed that color can be adjusted in printing (with limitations, see above). Color transparency film, being the final artefact in the process, has to be matched to the light source or filters must be used to correct color.

Filters on a camera lens, or color gels over the light source(s) may be used to correct color balance. When shooting with a bluish light (high color temperature) source such as on an overcast day, in the shade, in window light, or if using tungsten film with white or blue light, a yellowish-orange filter will correct this. For shooting with daylight film (calibrated to 5600 K) under warmer (low color temperature) light sources such as sunsets, candlelight or tungsten lighting, a bluish (e.g. #80A) filter may be used. More-subtle filters are needed to correct for the difference between, say 3200 K and 3400 K tungsten lamps or to correct for the slightly blue cast of some flash tubes, which may be 6000 K.

If there is more than one light source with varied color temperatures, one way to balance the color is to use daylight film and place color-correcting gel filters over each light source.

Photographers sometimes use color temperature meters. These are usually designed to read only two regions along the visible spectrum (red and blue); more expensive ones read three regions (red, green, and blue). However, they are ineffective with sources such as fluorescent or discharge lamps, whose light varies in color and may be harder to correct for. Because this light is often greenish, a magenta filter may correct it. More sophisticated colorimetry tools can be used if such meters are lacking.

=== Desktop publishing ===
In the desktop publishing industry, it is important to know a monitor's color temperature. Color matching software, such as Apple's ColorSync Utility for MacOS, measures a monitor's color temperature and then adjusts its settings accordingly. This enables on-screen color to more closely match printed color. Common monitor color temperatures, along with matching standard illuminants in parentheses, are as follows:

- 5000 K (CIE D50)
- 5500 K (CIE D55)
- 6500 K (D65)
- 7500 K (CIE D75)
- 9300 K

D50 is scientific shorthand for a standard illuminant: the daylight spectrum at a correlated color temperature of 5000 K. Similar definitions exist for D55, D65 and D75. Designations such as D50 are used to help classify color temperatures of light tables and viewing booths. When viewing a color slide at a light table, it is important that the light be balanced properly so that the colors are not shifted towards the red or blue.

Digital cameras, web graphics, DVDs, etc., are normally designed for a 6500 K color temperature. The sRGB standard commonly used for images on the Internet stipulates a 6500 K display white point.

Microsoft Windows prior to Windows 10 uses sRGB as the default display color space, and 6500 K as the default display color temperature. Windows 10 1607 supports High Dynamic Range. Windows 11 22H2 has support for Auto Color Management (ACM), which helped further optimize OLED and/or wide-color gamut monitors by reading DisplayID data.

Apple iOS, iPadOS and macOS currently use sRGB and DCI-P3 as the default display color spaces.

=== TV, video, and digital still cameras ===
The NTSC and PAL TV norms call for a compliant TV screen to display an electrically black and white signal (minimal color saturation) at a color temperature of 6500 K. On many consumer-grade televisions, there is a very noticeable deviation from this requirement. However, higher-end consumer-grade televisions can have their color temperatures adjusted to 6500 K by using a preprogrammed setting or a custom calibration. Current versions of ATSC explicitly call for the color temperature data to be included in the data stream, but old versions of ATSC allowed this data to be omitted. In this case, current versions of ATSC cite default colorimetry standards depending on the format. Both of the cited standards specify a 6500 K color temperature.

Most video and digital still cameras can adjust for color temperature by zooming into a white or neutral colored object and setting the manual "white balance" (telling the camera that "this object is white"); the camera then shows true white as white and adjusts all the other colors accordingly. White-balancing is necessary especially when indoors under fluorescent lighting and when moving the camera from one lighting situation to another. Most cameras also have an automatic white balance function that attempts to determine the color of the light and correct accordingly. While these settings were once unreliable, they are much improved in today's digital cameras and produce an accurate white balance in a wide variety of lighting situations.

However, in NTSC-J and NTSC-C standards, 9300 K color temperature is recommended. TVs and projectors sold in Japan, South Korea, China, Hong Kong, Taiwan and Philippines are usually adopt 9300 K as default settings. But for compatibility reasons, computer monitors sold in these country/region are usually adopt 6500 K as default settings; these color temperature settings are usually tuneable in OSD menu.

Now many FHD and UHD streaming dramas and films are produced using Rec. 709 or DCI-P3, which based on 6300 K or 6500 K color temperature.

=== Artistic application via control of color temperature ===
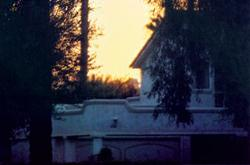
The house above appears a light cream during midday, but seems to be bluish white here in the dim light before full sunrise. Note the color temperature of the sunrise in the background.

Video camera operators can white-balance objects that are not white, downplaying the color of the object used for white-balancing. For instance, they can bring more warmth into a picture by white-balancing off something that is light blue, such as faded blue denim; in this way white-balancing can replace a filter or lighting gel when those are not available.

Cinematographers do not "white balance" in the same way as video camera operators; they use techniques such as filters, choice of film stock, pre-flashing, and, after shooting, color grading, both by exposure at the labs and also digitally. Cinematographers also work closely with set designers and lighting crews to achieve the desired color effects.

For artists, most pigments and papers have a cool or warm cast, as the human eye can detect even a minute amount of saturation. Gray mixed with yellow, orange, or red is a "warm gray". Green, blue, or purple create "cool grays". This sense of temperature is the reverse of that of real temperature; bluer is described as "cooler" even though it corresponds to a higher-temperature black body.

"Warm" gray	"Cool" gray
Mixed with 6% yellow	Mixed with 6% blue

Lighting designers sometimes select filters by color temperature, commonly to match light that is theoretically white. Since fixtures using discharge type lamps produce a light of a considerably higher color temperature than do tungsten lamps, using the two in conjunction could potentially produce a stark contrast, so sometimes fixtures with HID lamps, commonly producing light of 6000–7000 K, are fitted with 3200 K filters to emulate tungsten light. Fixtures with color mixing features or with multiple colors (if including 3200 K), are also capable of producing tungsten-like light. Color temperature may also be a factor when selecting lamps, since each is likely to have a different color temperature.

== Correlated color temperature ==
Log-log graphs of peak emission wavelength and radiant exitance vs black-body temperature, plotted on the blue line. Red arrows show that 5780 K black bodies have 501 nm peak wavelength and 63.3 MW/m^{2} radiant exitance.

Correlated color temperature (CCT, T_{cp}) refers to the "temperature of a Planckian radiator whose perceived color most closely resembles that of a given stimulus at the same brightness and under specified viewing conditions". The SI unit is the Kelvin (K).

== Color rendering index ==
The CIE color rendering index (CRI) is a method to determine how well a light source's illumination of eight sample patches compares to the illumination provided by a reference source. Cited together, the CRI and CCT give a numerical estimate of what reference (ideal) light source best approximates a particular artificial light, and what the difference is.

== Spectral power distribution ==
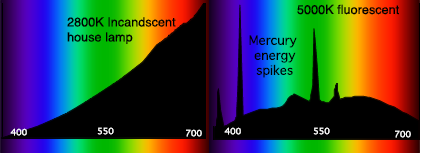
Characteristic spectral power distributions (SPDs) for an incandescent lamp (left) and a fluorescent lamp (right). The horizontal axes are wavelengths in nanometers, and the vertical axes show relative intensity in arbitrary units.

Light sources and illuminants may be characterized by their spectral power distribution (SPD). The relative SPD curves provided by many manufacturers may have been produced using 10 nm increments or more on their spectroradiometer. The result is what would seem to be a smoother ("fuller spectrum") power distribution than the lamp actually has. Owing to their spiky distribution, much finer increments are advisable for taking measurements of fluorescent lights, and this requires more expensive equipment.

== Color temperature in astronomy ==
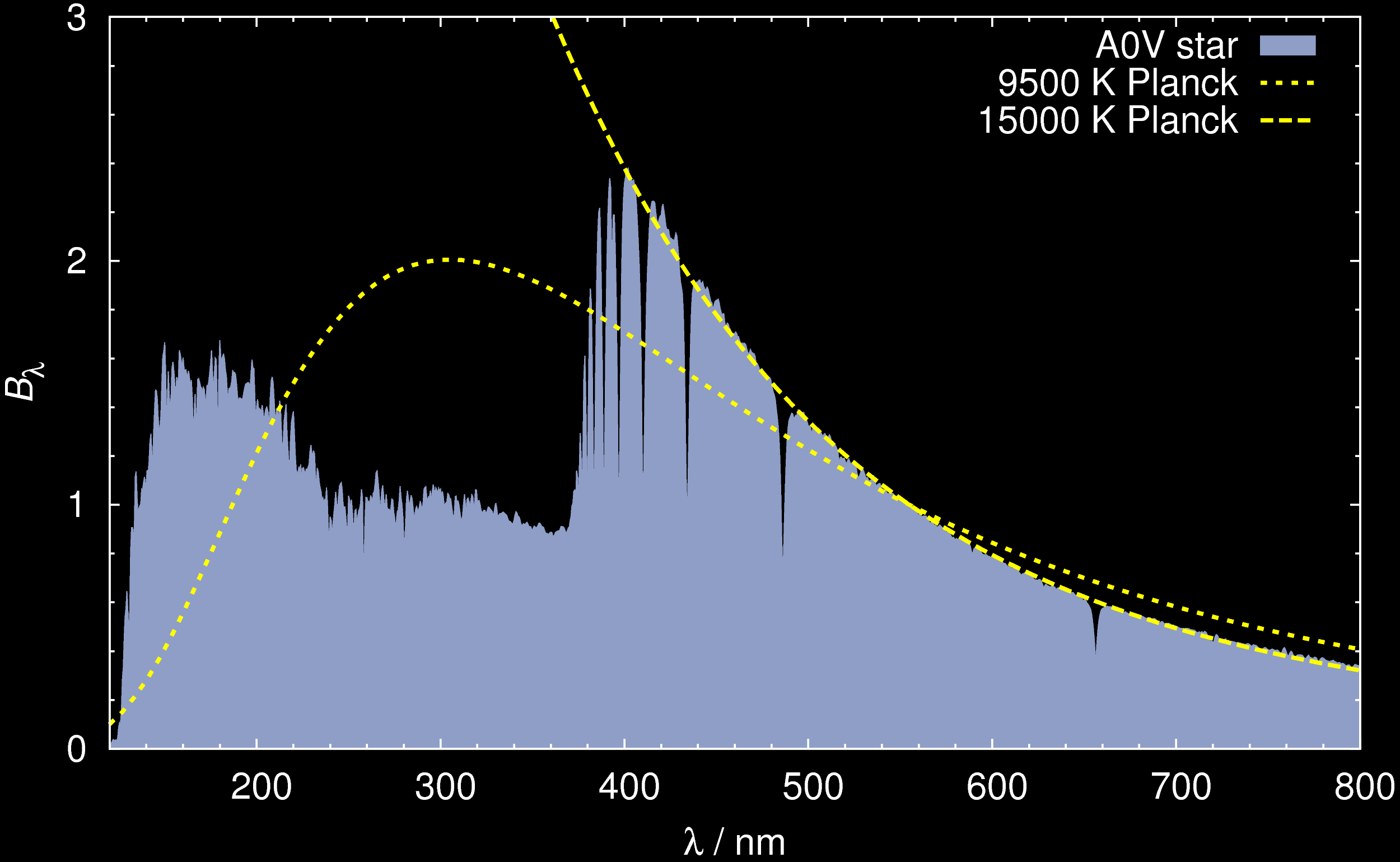
Characteristic spectral power distribution of an A0V star (T_{eff} = 9500 K, cf. Vega) compared to black-body spectra. The 15,000 K black-body spectrum (dashed line) matches the visible part of the stellar SPD much better than the black body of 9500 K. All spectra are normalized to intersect at 555 nanometers.

In astronomy, the color temperature is defined by the local slope of the SPD at a given wavelength, or, in practice, a wavelength range. Given, for example, the color magnitudes B and V which are calibrated to be equal for an A0V star (e.g. Vega), the stellar color temperature $T_C$ is given by the temperature for which the color index $B-V$ of a black-body radiator fits the stellar one. Besides the $B-V$, other color indices can be used as well. The color temperature (as well as the correlated color temperature defined above) may differ largely from the effective temperature given by the radiative flux of the stellar surface. For example, the color temperature of an A0V star is about 15000 K compared to an effective temperature of about 9500 K.

For most applications in astronomy (e.g., to place a star on the HR diagram or to determine the temperature of a model flux fitting an observed spectrum) the effective temperature is the quantity of interest. Various color-effective temperature relations exist in the literature. There relations also have smaller dependencies on other stellar parameters, such as the stellar metallicity and surface gravity.

== See also ==
- Brightness temperature
- CIE 1931 color space
- Color balance
- Color metamerism
- Colored fire
- Effective temperature
- Kruithof curve
- Luminous efficacy
- Overillumination
- Whiteness
