= Whiteness =

Whiteness may refer to:

- Light skin
  - The racial and cultural identity of white people
    - Whiteness studies, an interdisciplinary academic field, exploring the identity of whiteness
      - Whiteness theory
    - Definitions of whiteness in the United States, the relationship between different U.S. ethnic groups around the concept of whiteness
- Dental shade scale of teeth
- Whiteness (colorimetry), the degree to which a surface is white
- Whiteness, Shetland, a place in Scotland
