= Whiteness (colorimetry) =

Degree to which a surface is white

In colorimetry, whiteness is the degree to which a surface is white. An example of its use might be to quantitatively compare two pieces of paper which appear white viewed individually, but not when juxtaposed.

The International Commission on Illumination describes it in the following terms:

To promote uniformity of practice in the evaluation of whiteness of surface colors, it is recommended that the formulæ for whiteness, W_{2} or W_{10}, and for tint, T_{w,2} or T_{w,10}, given below, be used for comparisons of the whiteness of samples evaluated for CIE standard illuminant D65. The application of the formulae is restricted to samples that are called "white" commercially, that do not differ much in color and fluorescence, and that are measured on the same instrument at nearly the same time. Within these restrictions, the formulæ provide relative, but not absolute, evaluations of whiteness, that are adequate for commercial use, when employing measuring instruments having suitable modern and commercially available facilities.

— CIE Publication 15:2004

== Calculation ==
$W_2=Y_2+800(x_{n,2}-x_2)+1700(y_{n,2}-y_2)$

$W_{10}=Y_{10}+800(x_{n,10}-x_{10})+1700(y_{n,10}-y_{10})$

$T_{w,2}=1000(x_{n,2}-x_2)-650(y_{n,2}-y_2)$

$T_{w,10}=900(x_{n,10}-x_{10})-650(y_{n,10}-y_{10})$

where

- $Y$ is the Y tristimulus value (relative luminance),
- $(x,y)$ is the chromaticity coordinate in the CIE 1931 color space
- $(x_n,y_n)$ is the chromaticity coordinate of the perfect diffuser (reference white)

The numbers in the subscript indicate the observer: two for the CIE 1931 standard observer and ten for the CIE 1964 standard observer.

=== Notes ===
- W increases with whiteness, reaching 100 for the perfect diffuser.
- The tint is green for positive T and red for negative T.
- Equal differences in W may not appear equally different.

== See also ==
- Color temperature
