= CIE 1960 color space =

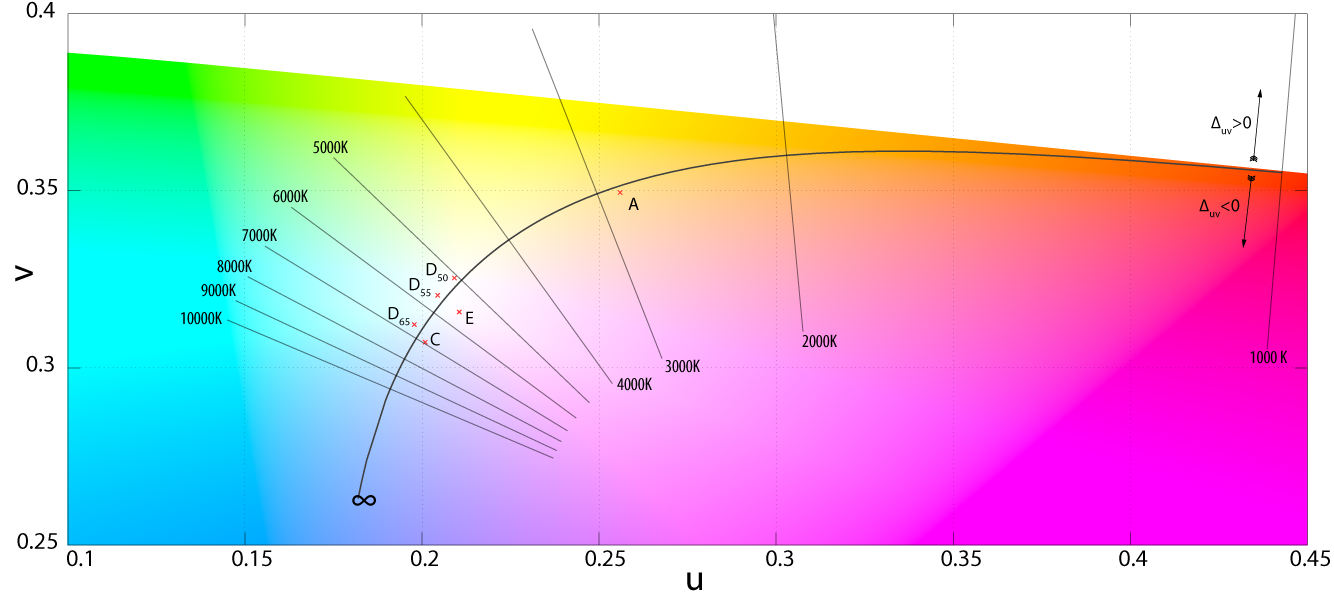
The Planckian locus on the MacAdam (u, v) chromaticity diagram. The normals are lines of equal correlated color temperature.

The CIE 1960 color space ("CIE 1960 UCS", variously expanded Uniform Color Space, Uniform Color Scale, Uniform Chromaticity Scale, Uniform Chromaticity Space) is another name for the (u, v) chromaticity space devised by David MacAdam.

The CIE 1960 UCS does not define a luminance or lightness component, but the Y tristimulus value of the XYZ color space or a lightness index similar to W* of the CIE 1964 color space are sometimes used.

Today, the CIE 1960 UCS is mostly used to calculate correlated color temperature, where the isothermal lines are perpendicular to the Planckian locus. As a uniform chromaticity space, it has been superseded by the CIE 1976 UCS.

== Background ==
Judd determined that a more uniform color space could be found by a simple projective transformation of the CIEXYZ tristimulus values:

$$\begin{pmatrix} ''R'' \\ ''G'' \\ ''B'' \end{pmatrix} = \begin{pmatrix} 3.1956 & 2.4478 & -0.1434 \\ -2.5455 & 7.0492 & 0.9963 \\ 0.0000 & 0.0000 & 1.0000 \end{pmatrix} \begin{pmatrix} X \\ Y \\ Z \end{pmatrix}$$

(Note: What we have called "G" and "B" here are not the G and B of the CIE 1931 color space and in fact are "colors" that do not exist at all.)

Judd was the first to employ this type of transformation, and many others were to follow. Converting this RGB space to chromaticities one finds

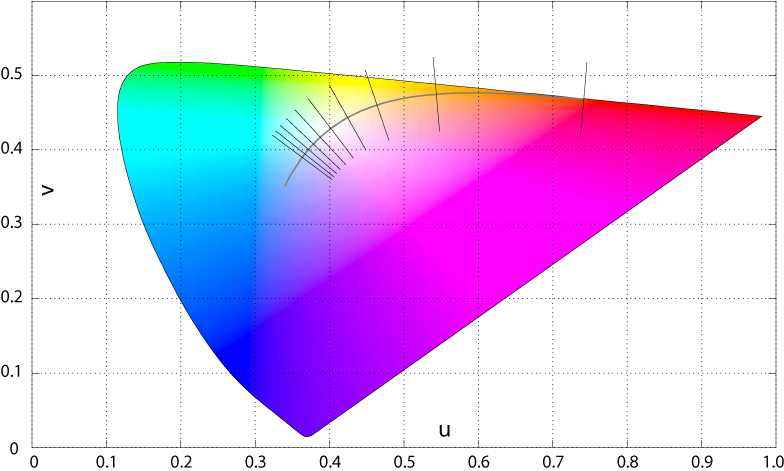
Judd's UCS, with the Planckian locus and the isotherms from 1,000K to 10,000K, perpendicular to the locus. Judd then translated these isotherms back into the CIEXYZ color space. (The colors used in this illustration are illustrative only and do not correspond to the true colors represented by the respective points.)

$$u_{\rm Judd}=\frac{0.4661x+0.1593y}{y-0.15735x+0.2424} = \frac{5.5932x+1.9116y}{12y-1.882x+2.9088}$$

$$v_{\rm Judd}=\frac{0.6581y}{y-0.15735x+0.2424} = \frac{7.8972y}{12y-1.882x+2.9088}$$

MacAdam simplified Judd's UCS for computational purposes:

$$u = \frac{4x}{12y - 2x + 3}$$

$$v = \frac{6y}{12y - 2x + 3}$$

The Colorimetry committee of the CIE considered MacAdam's proposal at its 14th Session in Brussels for use in situations where more perceptual uniformity was desired than the (x,y) chromaticity space, and officially adopted it as the standard UCS the next year.

== Relation to CIE XYZ ==
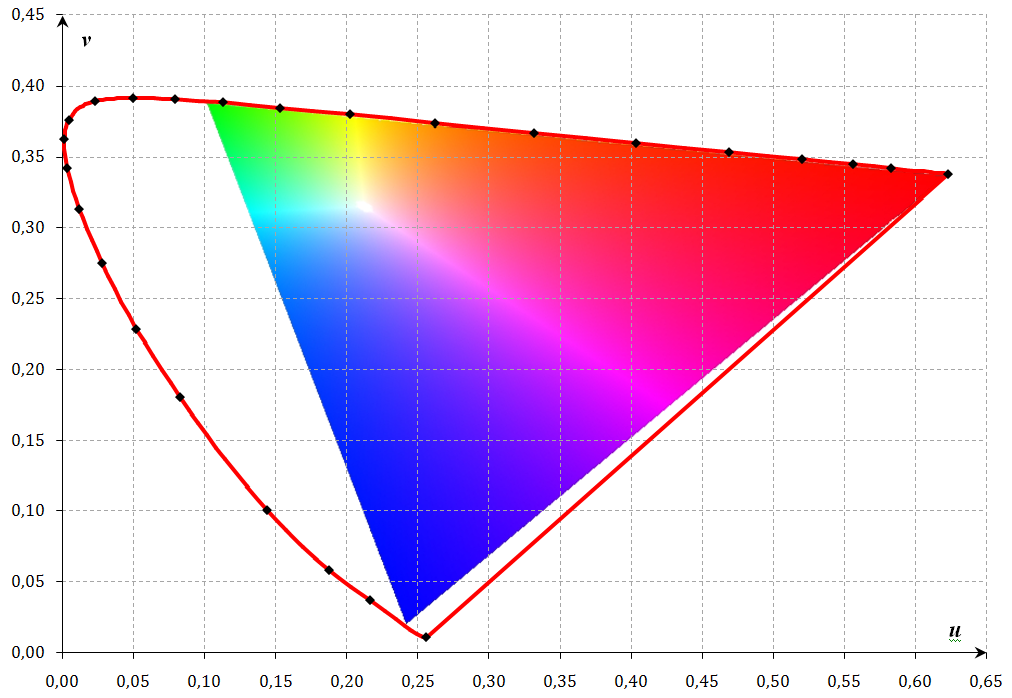
The CIE 1960 UCS, also known as the MacAdam (u,v) chromaticity diagram. The colored triangle represents the CIE RGB gamut.

U, V, and W can be found from X, Y, and Z using:

$$U= \textstyle{\frac{2}{3}}X$$
$$V=Y\,$$
$$W=\textstyle{\frac{1}{2}}(-X+3Y+Z)$$

Going the other way:

$$X=\textstyle{\frac 32}U$$
$$Y=V$$
$$Z=\textstyle{\frac{3}{2}}U-3V+2W$$

We then find the chromaticity variables as:

$$u =\frac U{U+V+W}= \frac{4X}{X + 15Y +3Z}$$
$$v =\frac V{U+V+W}= \frac{6Y}{X + 15Y + 3Z}$$

We can also convert from u and v to x and y:

$$x = \frac{3u}{2u - 8v + 4}$$
$$y = \frac{2v}{2u - 8v + 4}$$

== Relation to CIE 1976 UCS ==
$$u^\prime = u\,$$
$$v^\prime = \textstyle{\frac{3}{2}}v\,$$
