= CIE 1964 color space =

Color space

The CIE 1964 (U*, V*, W*) color space, also known as CIEUVW, is based on the CIE 1960 UCS:

$$U^*=13W^*(u-u_0), \quad V^*=13W^*(v-v_0), \quad W^*=25Y^\frac13-17$$

where (u_{0}, v_{0}) is the white point and Y is the luminous tristimulus value of the object. The asterisks in the exponent indicates that the variable represent a more perceptually uniform color space than its predecessor (compare with CIELAB).

Günter Wyszecki invented the UVW color space in order to be able to calculate color differences without having to hold the luminance constant. He defined a lightness index W* by simplifying expressions suggested earlier by Ladd and Pinney, and Glasser et al.. The chromaticity components U* and V* are defined such that the white point maps to the origin, as in Adams chromatic valence color spaces. This arrangement has the benefit of being able to express the loci of chromaticities with constant saturation simply as (U*)^{2} + (V*)^{2} = C for a constant C. Furthermore, the chromaticity axes are scaled by the lightness "so as to account for the apparent increase or decrease in saturation when the lightness index is increased or decreased, respectively, and the chromaticity (u, v) is kept constant".

== Chromaticity and color difference ==
The chromaticity coefficients were chosen "on the basis of the spacing of the Munsell system. A lightness difference ΔW = 1 is assumed to correspond to a chromaticness difference √ΔU^{2} + ΔV^{2} = 13 (approximately)."

With the coefficients thus selected, the color difference in CIEUVW is simply the Euclidean distance:

$$\Delta E_\text{CIEUVW}=\sqrt{ \left(\Delta U^*\right)^2 + \left(\Delta V^*\right)^2 + \left(\Delta W^*\right)^2}$$
