= Standard illuminant =

Theoretical source of visible light

Relative spectral power distributions (SPDs) of CIE illuminants A, B, and C from 380 nm to 780 nm

A standard illuminant is a theoretical source of visible light with a spectral power distribution that is published. Standard illuminants provide a basis for comparing images or colors recorded under different lighting.

== CIE illuminants ==
The International Commission on Illumination (usually abbreviated CIE for its French name) is the body responsible for publishing all of the well-known standard illuminants. Each of these is known by a letter or by a letter-number combination.

Illuminants A, B, and C were introduced in 1931, with the intention of respectively representing average incandescent light, direct sunlight, and average daylight. Illuminants D (1967) represent variations of daylight, illuminant E is the equal-energy illuminant, while illuminants F (2004) represent fluorescent lamps of various composition.

There are instructions on how to experimentally produce light sources ("standard sources") corresponding to the older illuminants. For the relatively newer ones (such as series D), experimenters are left to measure to profiles of their sources and compare them to the published spectra:

At present no artificial source is recommended to realize CIE standard illuminant D65 or any other illuminant D of different CCT. It is hoped that new developments in light sources and filters will eventually offer sufficient basis for a CIE recommendation.

— CIE, Technical Report (2004) Colorimetry, 3rd ed., Publication 15:2004, CIE Central Bureau, Vienna

Nevertheless, they do provide a measure, called the metamerism index, to assess the quality of daylight simulators. The Metamerism Index tests how well five sets of metameric samples match under the test and reference illuminant. In a manner similar to the color rendering index, the average difference between the metamers is calculated.

=== Illuminant A ===
The CIE defines illuminant A in these terms:

CIE standard illuminant A is intended to represent typical, domestic, tungsten-filament lighting. Its relative spectral power distribution is that of a Planckian radiator at a temperature of approximately 2856 K. CIE standard illuminant A should be used in all applications of colorimetry involving the use of incandescent lighting, unless there are specific reasons for using a different illuminant.

— CIE, CIE Standard Illuminants for Colorimetry

The spectral radiant exitance of a black body follows Planck's law:
$$M_{e,\lambda}(\lambda, T) = \frac{c_1 \lambda^{-5}}{\exp\left(\frac{c_2}{\lambda T}\right) - 1}.$$

At the time of standardizing illuminant A, both $c_1 = 2\pi \cdot h \cdot c^2$ (which does not affect the relative SPD) and $c_2 = h \cdot c/k$ were different. In 1968, the estimate of c_{2} was revised from 0.01438 m·K to 0.014388 m·K (and before that, it was 0.01435 m·K when illuminant A was standardized). This difference shifted the Planckian locus, changing the color temperature of the illuminant from its nominal 2848 K to 2856 K:
$$T_\text{new} = T_\text{old} \times \frac{1.4388}{1.435} = 2848\ \text{K} \times 1.002648 = 2855.54\ \text{K}.$$

In order to avoid further possible changes in the color temperature, the CIE now specifies the SPD directly, based on the original (1931) value of c_{2}:
$$S_\text{A}(\lambda) = 100\left(\frac{560}{\lambda}\right)^5 \frac{\exp \frac{1.435 \times 10^7}{2848 \times 560} - 1}{\exp\frac{1.435 \times 10^7}{2848 \lambda} - 1}.$$

for a wavelength λ (nm). The coefficients have been selected to achieve a normalized SPD of 100 at 560 nm. The tristimulus values are (X, Y, Z) = (109.85, 100.00, 35.58), and the chromaticity coordinates using the standard observer are (x, y) = (0.44758, 0.40745).

=== Illuminants B and C ===
Illuminants B and C are easily achieved daylight simulations. They modify illuminant A by using liquid filters. B served as a representative of noon sunlight, with a correlated color temperature (CCT) of 4874 K, while C represented average day light with a CCT of 6774 K. Unfortunately, they are poor approximations of any phase of natural daylight, particularly in the short-wave visible and in the ultraviolet spectral ranges. Once more realistic simulations were achievable, illuminants B and C were deprecated in favor of the D series.

Illuminant C does not have the status of CIE standard illuminants but its relative spectral power distribution, tristimulus values and chromaticity coordinates are given in Table T.1 and Table T.3, as many practical measurement instruments and calculations still use this illuminant.

— CIE, Publication 15:2004

Illuminant B was not so honored in 2004.

The liquid filters, designed by Raymond Davis and Kasson S. Gibson in 1931, have a relatively high absorbance at the red end of the spectrum, effectively increasing the CCT of the incandescent lamp to daylight levels. This is similar in function to a CTB color gel that photographers and cinematographers use today, albeit much less convenient.

Each filter uses a pair of solutions, comprising specific amounts of distilled water, copper sulfate, mannite, pyridine, sulfuric acid, cobalt, and ammonium sulfate. The solutions are separated by a sheet of uncolored glass. The amounts of the ingredients are carefully chosen so that their combination yields a color temperature conversion filter; that is, the filtered light is still white.

=== Illuminant series D ===
Relative spectral power distribution of illuminant D and a black body of the same correlated color temperature (in red), normalized about 560 nm

The D series of illuminants are designed to represent natural daylight and lie along the daylight locus. They are difficult to produce artificially, but are easy to characterize mathematically.

By 1964, several spectral power distributions (SPDs) of daylight had been measured independently by H. W. Budde of the National Research Council of Canada in Ottawa, H. R. Condit and F. Grum of the Eastman Kodak Company in Rochester, New York, and S. T. Henderson and D. Hodgkiss of Thorn Electrical Industries in Enfield (north London), totaling among them 622 samples. Deane B. Judd, David MacAdam, and Günter Wyszecki analyzed these samples and found that the (x, y) chromaticity coordinates followed a simple, quadratic relation, later known as the daylight locus:

$$y = 2.870 x - 3.000 x^2 - 0.275.$$

Characteristic vector analysis revealed that the SPDs could be satisfactorily approximated by using the mean (S_{0}) and first two characteristic vectors (S_{1} and S_{2}):

$$S_D(\lambda) = S_0(\lambda) + M_1 S_1(\lambda) + M_2 S_2(\lambda).$$

Characteristic vectors of illuminant D; component SPDs S_{0} (blue), S_{1} (green), S_{2} (red).

In simpler terms, the SPD of the studied daylight samples can be expressed as the linear combination of three, fixed SPDs. The first vector (S_{0}) is the mean of all the SPD samples, which is the best reconstituted SPD that can be formed with only a fixed vector. The second vector (S_{1}) corresponds to yellow–blue variation (along the locus), accounting for changes in the correlated color temperature due to proportion of indirect to direct sunlight. The third vector (S_{2}) corresponds to pink–green variation (across the locus) caused by the presence of water in the form of vapor and haze.

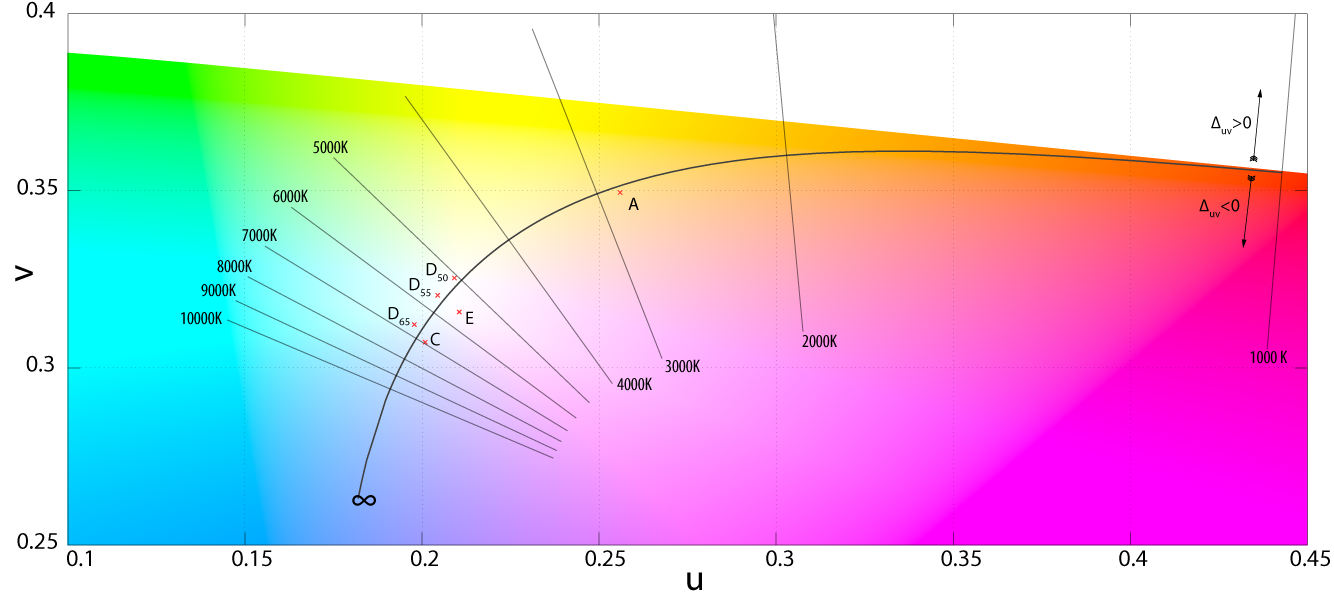
The Planckian locus is depicted on the CIE 1960 UCS, along with isotherms (lines of constant correlated color temperature) and representative illuminant coordinates.

By the time the D-series was formalized by the CIE, a computation of the chromaticity $(x,y)$ for a particular isotherm was included. Judd et al. then extended the reconstituted SPDs to 300 nm–330 nm and 700 nm–830 nm by using Moon's spectral absorbance data of the Earth's atmosphere. The tabulated SPDs presented by the CIE today are derived by linear interpolation of the 10 nm data set down to 5 nm. However, there is a proposal to use spline interpolation instead.

Similar studies have been undertaken in other parts of the world, or repeating Judd et al.'s analysis with modern computational methods. In several of these studies, the daylight locus is notably closer to the Planckian locus than in Judd et al.

The CIE positions D65 as the standard daylight illuminant:

[D65] is intended to represent average daylight and has a correlated colour temperature of approximately 6500 K. CIE standard illuminant D65 should be used in all colorimetric calculations requiring representative daylight, unless there are specific reasons for using a different illuminant. Variations in the relative spectral power distribution of daylight are known to occur, particularly in the ultraviolet spectral region, as a function of season, time of day, and geographic location.

— ISO 10526:1999/CIE S005/E-1998, CIE Standard Illuminants for Colorimetry

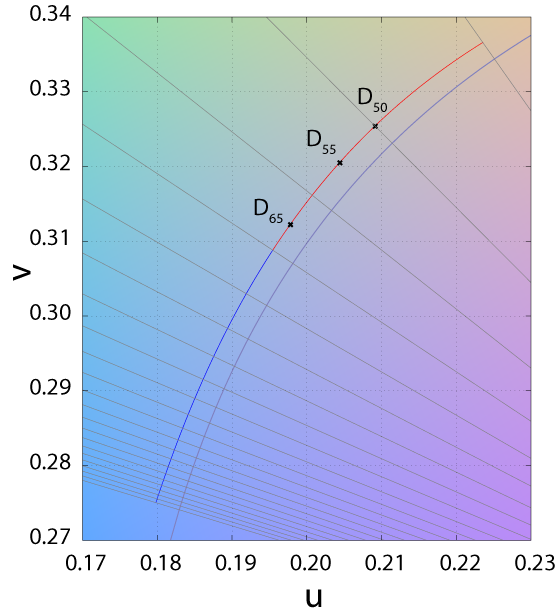
Daylight locus in the CIE 1960 UCS. The isotherms are perpendicular to the Planckian locus. The two sections of the daylight locus, from 4000–7000 K and 7000–25000 K, are color-coded. Note that the two loci are separated by a fairly even distance, of around $\Delta_{uv}=0.003$.

==== Computation ====
The relative spectral power distribution (SPD) $S_D (\lambda)$ of a D series illuminant can be derived from its chromaticity coordinates in the CIE 1931 color space, $(x_D,y_D)$. First, the chromaticity coordinates must be determined:

$$x_D = \begin{cases}
0.244063 + 0.09911 \frac{10^3}{T} + 2.9678 \frac{10^6}{T^2} - 4.6070 \frac{10^9}{T^3} & 4000\ \mathrm{K} \leq T \leq 7000\ \ \mathrm{K} \\
0.237040 + 0.24748 \frac{10^3}{T} + 1.9018 \frac{10^6}{T^2} - 2.0064 \frac{10^9}{T^3} & 7000\ \mathrm{K} < T \leq 25000\ \mathrm{K}
\end{cases}$$
$$y_D = -3.000 x_D^2 + 2.870 x_D - 0.275$$

where T is the illuminant's CCT. Note that the CCTs of the canonical illuminants, D_{50}, D_{55}, D_{65}, and D_{75}, differ slightly from what their names suggest. For example, D50 has a CCT of 5003 K ("horizon" light), while D65 has a CCT of 6504 K (noon light). This is because the originally experimentally determined values of the constants in Planck's law have become more accurately known (and now take on fixed values in the international system of units and measurements) since the definition of these canonical illuminants, whose SPDs are based on the original values in Planck's law. The same discrepancy applies to all illuminants in the D series—D_{50}, D_{55}, D_{65}, D_{75}—and can be "rectified" by multiplying the nominal color temperature by $\frac{c_2}{1.4380}$; for example $6500\ \text{K} \times \frac{1.438776877\dots}{1.4380} = 6503.51\ \text{K}$ for D_{65}.

To determine the D-series SPD (S_{D}) that corresponds to those coordinates, the coefficients M_{1} and M_{2} of the characteristic vectors S_{1} and S_{2} are determined:

$$S_D(\lambda) = S_0(\lambda) + M_1 S_1(\lambda) + M_2 S_2(\lambda),$$
$$M_1 = (-1.3515 - 1.7703 x_D + 5.9114 y_D)/M,$$
$$M_2 = (0.0300 - 31.4424 x_D + 30.0717 y_D)/M,$$
$$M = 0.0241 + 0.2562 x_D - 0.7341 y_D$$

where $S_0(\lambda), S_1(\lambda), S_2(\lambda)$ are the mean and first two eigenvector SPDs, depicted in figure. The characteristic vectors both have a zero at 560 nm, since all the relative SPDs have been normalized about this point. In order to match all significant digits of the published data of the canonical illuminants the values of M_{1} and M_{2} have to be rounded to three decimal places before calculation of S_{D}.

==== D65 values ====
Using the standard 2° observer, the CIE 1931 color space chromaticity coordinates of D65 are

$$\begin{align}
x &= 0.31272 \\
y &= 0.32903
\end{align}$$

and the XYZ tristimulus values (normalized to Y = 100), are

$$\begin{alignat}{2}
X &={}& 95.047 \\
Y &={}& 100\phantom{.000} \\
Z &={}& 108.883
\end{alignat}$$

For the supplementary 10° observer,

$$\begin{align}
x &= 0.31382 \\
y &= 0.33100
\end{align}$$
and the corresponding XYZ tristimulus values are

$$\begin{alignat}{2}
X &={}& 94.811 \\
Y &={}& 100\phantom{.000} \\
Z &={}& 107.304
\end{alignat}$$

Since D65 represents white light, its coordinates are also a white point, corresponding to a correlated color temperature of 6504 K. Rec. 709, used in HDTV systems, truncates the CIE 1931 coordinates to x=0.3127, y=0.329.

==== Daylight simulator ====
There are no actual daylight light sources, only simulators. Constructing a practical light source that emulates a D-series illuminant is a difficult problem. The chromaticity can be replicated simply by taking a well known light source and applying filters, such as the Spectralight III, that used filtered incandescent lamps. However, the SPDs of these sources deviate from the D-series SPD, leading to bad performance on the CIE metamerism index. Better sources were achieved in the 2010s with phosphor-coated white LEDs that can easily emulate the A, D, and E illuminants with high CRI.

=== Illuminant E ===
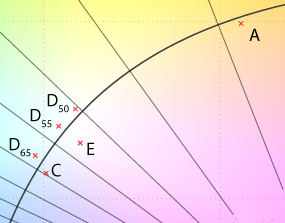
Illuminant E is beneath the Planckian locus, and roughly at the CCT of D_{55}.

Illuminant E is an equal-energy radiator; it has a constant SPD inside the visible spectrum. It is useful as a theoretical reference; an illuminant that gives equal weight to all wavelengths. It also has equal CIE XYZ tristimulus values, thus its chromaticity coordinates are (x,y)=(1/3,1/3). This is by design; the XYZ color matching functions are normalized such that their integrals over the visible spectrum are the same.

Illuminant E is not a black body, so it does not have a color temperature, but it can be approximated by a D series illuminant with a CCT of 5455 K. (Of the canonical illuminants, D_{55} is the closest.) Manufacturers sometimes compare light sources against illuminant E to calculate the excitation purity.

=== Illuminant series FL ===
CIE Publication 15.2 introduced twelve new illuminants representing several fluorescent lamps and comprising series F, later renamed to series FL from CIE Publication 15:2004 onward. The original 12 standards are distributed to 3 groups:

- Standards FL1–FL6 represent "standard" fluorescent lamps consisting of two semi-broadband emissions of antimony and manganese activations in calcium halophosphate phosphor. FL4 is of particular interest since it was used for calibrating the CIE color rendering index (the CRI formula was chosen such that FL4 would have a CRI of 51).
- Standards FL7–FL9 represent "broadband" (full-spectrum light) fluorescent lamps with multiple phosphors, and higher CRIs.
- Standards FL10–FL12 represent narrow triband illuminants consisting of three "narrowband" emissions (caused by ternary compositions of rare-earth phosphors) in the R,G,B regions of the visible spectrum, which leads to poor CRI.

The members within a group represent different CCTs, such that the phosphor weights can be tuned to achieve the desired CCT. In each of these three groups, CIE states that FL2, FL7, and FL11 "take priority" to be representative of their respective groups.

FL1–6: Standard

FL7–9: Broadband

FL10–12: Narrowband

CIE 15:2004 also introduced fifteen new fluorescent illuminants representing different kinds of fluorescent lamps and comprising subseries FL3. These 15 standards are distributed in 5 groups:

- Standards FL3.1-FL3.3 represent standard halophosphate lamps (similar to FL1-6)
- Standards FL3.4-FL3.6 represent DeLuxe type lamps (similar to FL7-9)
- Standards FL3.7-FL3.11 represent three-band lamps (similar to FL10-12)
- Standards FL3.12-FL3.14 represent multi-band lamps
- Standard FL3.15 represents a D65 simulating fluorescent lamp
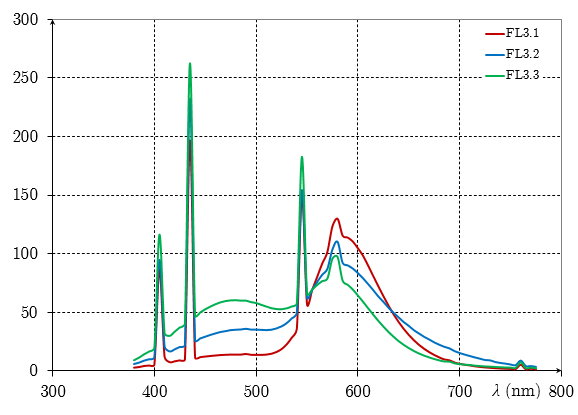
FL3.1-3.3 : standard

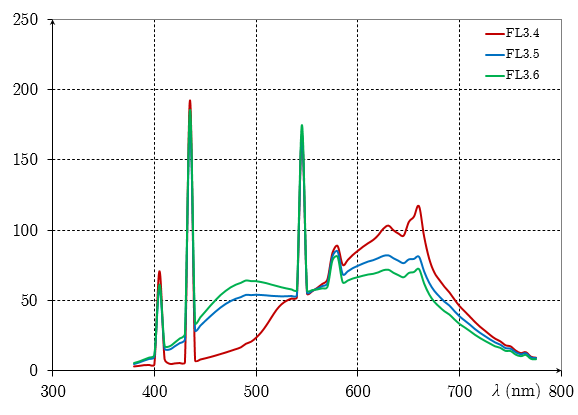
FL3.4-3.6 : DeLuxe

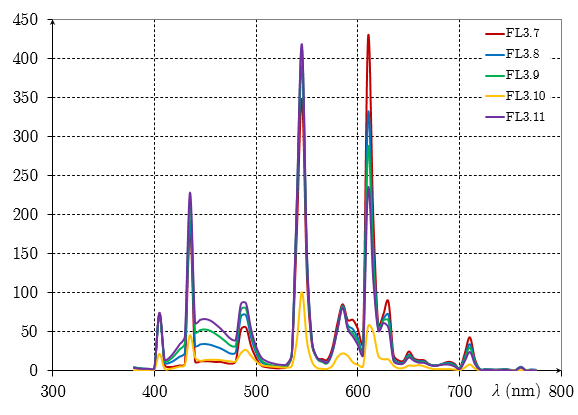
FL3.7-3.11 : three-band

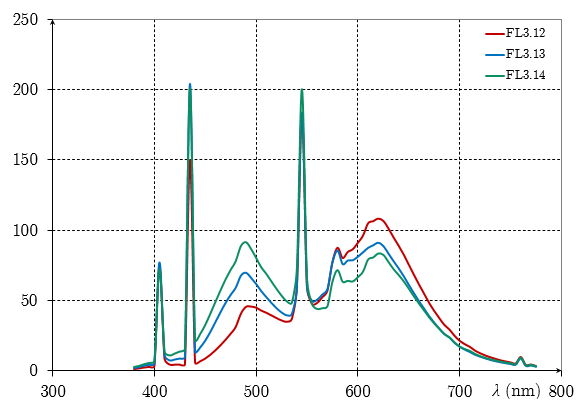
FL3.12-3.14 : multi-band

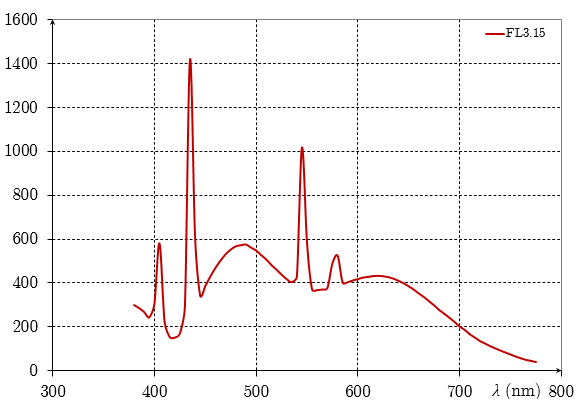
FL3.15 : D65 simulator

=== Illuminant series HP ===
CIE 15:2004 introduced five new illuminants representing different kinds of high pressure discharge lamps and comprising series HP.:

- Standard HP1 for standard high-pressure sodium lamps
- Standard HP2 for color-enhanced high-pressure sodium lamps
- Standards HP3-HP5 for metal halide lamps.
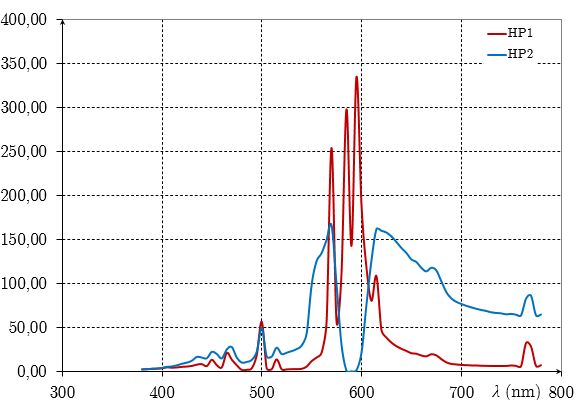
HP1 and HP2

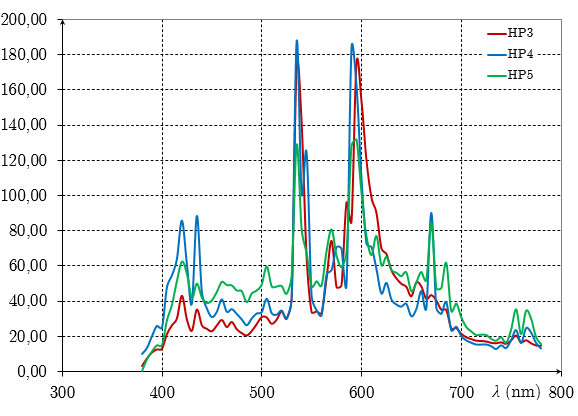
HP3 to HP5

=== Illuminant series LED ===
CIE Publication 15:2018 introduces nine new illuminants representing several white LEDs with CCTs ranging from 2700~6600 K. LED-B1 through B5 define standard LED illuminants with phosphor-converted blue light. LED-BH1 defines a blend of phosphor-converted blue and a red LED. LED-RGB1 defines the white light produced by a tricolor LED mix. LED-V1 and V2 define LEDs with phosphor-converted violet light.

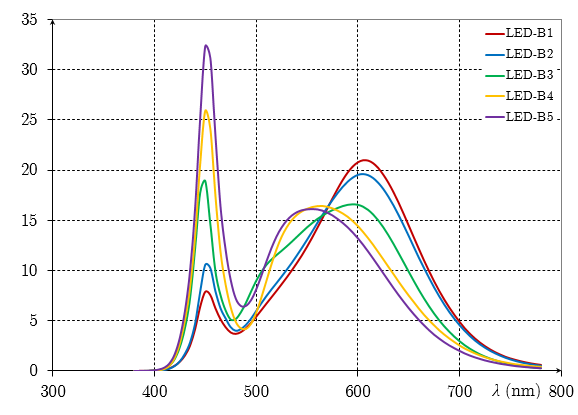
LED-B1 to B5

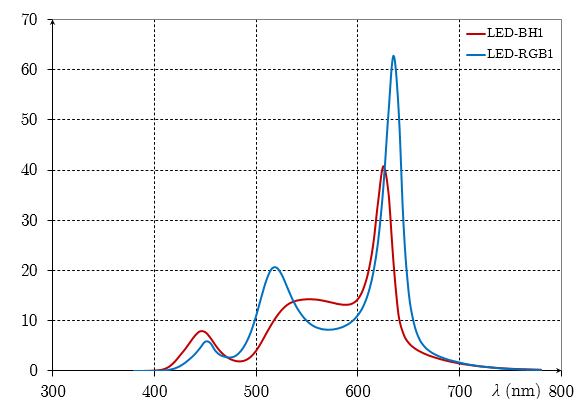
LED-BH1 and RGB1

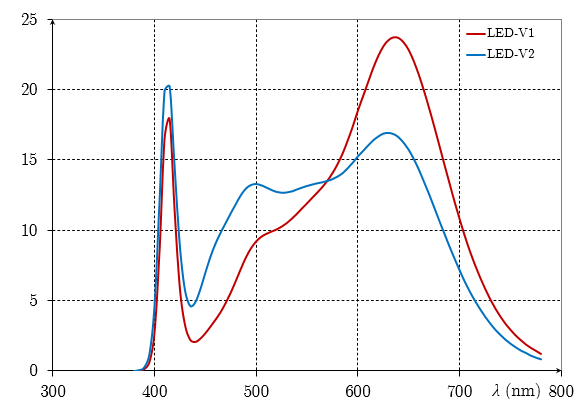
LED-V1 and V2

=== Illuminant series ID ===
CIE publication 184:2009 introduced two new illuminants representing natural indoor light, which were later included as series ID in CIE 15:2018. ID50 and ID65 are equivalent to their outdoor counterparts, D50 and D65, filtered through window glass, thereby removing the ultraviolet contents. The indoor CCTs are about 100K higher (cooler) relative to their outdoor counterparts.

CIE standard illuminants D65 and ID65 in comparison.

CIE standard illuminants D50 and ID50 in comparison.

Relative transmission of 10mm glass sheet based on CIE illuminants ID65 and D65.

== White point ==
The spectrum of a standard illuminant, like any other profile of light, can be converted into tristimulus values. The set of three tristimulus coordinates of an illuminant is called a white point. If the profile is normalized, then the white point can equivalently be expressed as a pair of chromaticity coordinates.

If an image is recorded in tristimulus coordinates (or in values which can be converted to and from them), then the white point of the illuminant used gives the maximum value of the tristimulus coordinates that will be recorded at any point in the image, in the absence of fluorescence. It is called the white point of the image.

The process of calculating the white point discards a great deal of information about the profile of the illuminant. So, although it is true that the exact white point for any given illuminant can be calculated, the reverse is not true: knowing the white point of an image alone reveals very little about the illuminant that was used to record it.

=== White points of standard illuminants ===
A list of standardized illuminants, their CIE chromaticity coordinates (x,y) of a perfectly reflecting (or transmitting) diffuser, and their correlated color temperatures (CCTs) are given below. The CIE chromaticity coordinates are given for both the 2 degree field of view (1931) and the 10 degree field of view (1964).The color swatches represent the color of each white point, automatically calculated by Wikipedia using the Color temperature template.

White points of standard illuminants
Name	CIE 1931 2°		CIE 1964 10°		CCT (K)	Note
Name	x_{2°}	y_{2°}	x_{10°}	y_{10°}	CCT (K)	Note
A	0.44758	0.40745	0.45117	0.40594	2856	incandescent / tungsten
B	0.34842	0.35161	0.34980	0.35270	4874	obsolete, direct sunlight at noon
C	0.31006	0.31616	0.31039	0.31905	6774	obsolete, average / North sky daylight NTSC 1953, PAL-M (Note: Displays simply use the white point of this standard illuminant; they do not emit the required spectrum.)
D50	0.34567	0.35850	0.34773	0.35952	5003	horizon light, ICC profile PCS
D55	0.33242	0.34743	0.33411	0.34877	5503	mid-morning / mid-afternoon daylight
D65	0.31272	0.32903	0.31382	0.33100	6504	noon daylight: television, sRGB color space
D75	0.29902	0.31485	0.29968	0.31740	7504	North sky daylight
D93	0.28315	0.29711	0.28327	0.30043	9305	high-efficiency blue phosphor monitors, BT.2035, NTSC-J
E	0.33333	0.33333	0.33333	0.33333	5454	equal energy
FL1	0.31310	0.33727	0.31811	0.33559	6430	daylight fluorescent
FL2	0.37208	0.37529	0.37925	0.36733	4230	cool white fluorescent
FL3	0.40910	0.39430	0.41761	0.38324	3450	white fluorescent
FL4	0.44018	0.40329	0.44920	0.39074	2940	warm white fluorescent
FL5	0.31379	0.34531	0.31975	0.34246	6350	daylight fluorescent
FL6	0.37790	0.38835	0.38660	0.37847	4150	light white fluorescent
FL7	0.31292	0.32933	0.31569	0.32960	6500	D65 simulator, daylight simulator
FL8	0.34588	0.35875	0.34902	0.35939	5000	D50 simulator, Sylvania F40 Design 50
FL9	0.37417	0.37281	0.37829	0.37045	4150	cool white deluxe fluorescent
FL10	0.34609	0.35986	0.35090	0.35444	5000	Philips TL85, Ultralume 50
FL11	0.38052	0.37713	0.38541	0.37123	4000	Philips TL84, Ultralume 40
FL12	0.43695	0.40441	0.44256	0.39717	3000	Philips TL83, Ultralume 30
FL3.1	0.4407	0.4033			2932	standard halophosphate
FL3.2	0.3808	0.3734			3965	standard halophosphate
FL3.3	0.3153	0.3439			6280	standard halophosphate
FL3.4	0.4429	0.4043			2904	DeLuxe type
FL3.5	0.3749	0.3672			4086	DeLuxe type
FL3.6	0.3488	0.3600			4894	DeLuxe type
FL3.7	0.4384	0.4045			2979	Three-band
FL3.8	0.3820	0.3832			4006	Three-band
FL3.9	0.3499	0.3591			4853	Three-band
FL3.10	0.3455	0.3560			5000	Three-band
FL3.11	0.3245	0.3434			5854	Three-band
FL3.12	0.4377	0.4037			2984	Multi-band
FL3.13	0.3830	0.3724			3896	Multi-band
FL3.14	0.3447	0.3609			5045	Multi-band
FL3.15	0.3127	0.3290			6509	D65 Simulator
HP1	0.533	0.415			1959	Standard high pressure sodium lamp
HP2	0.4778	0.4158			2506	Color-enhanced high-pressure sodium lamp
HP3	0.4302	0.4075			3144	High pressure metal halide lamp
HP4	0.3812	0.3797			4002	High pressure metal halide lamp
HP5	0.3776	0.3713			4039	High pressure metal halide lamp
LED-B1	0.4560	0.4078			2733	phosphor-converted blue
LED-B2	0.4357	0.4012			2998	phosphor-converted blue
LED-B3	0.3756	0.3723			4103	phosphor-converted blue
LED-B4	0.3422	0.3502			5109	phosphor-converted blue
LED-B5	0.3118	0.3236			6598	phosphor-converted blue
LED-BH1	0.4474	0.4066			2851	mixing of phosphor-converted blue LED and red LED (blue-hybrid)
LED-RGB1	0.4557	0.4211			2840	mixing of red, green, and blue LEDs
LED-V1	0.4548	0.4044			2724	phosphor-converted violet
LED-V2	0.3781	0.3775			4070	phosphor-converted violet
ID50	0.3432	0.3602			5098	natural indoor daylight
ID65	0.3107	0.3307			6603	natural indoor daylight
