= Planckian locus =

Locus of colors of incandescent black bodies within a color space

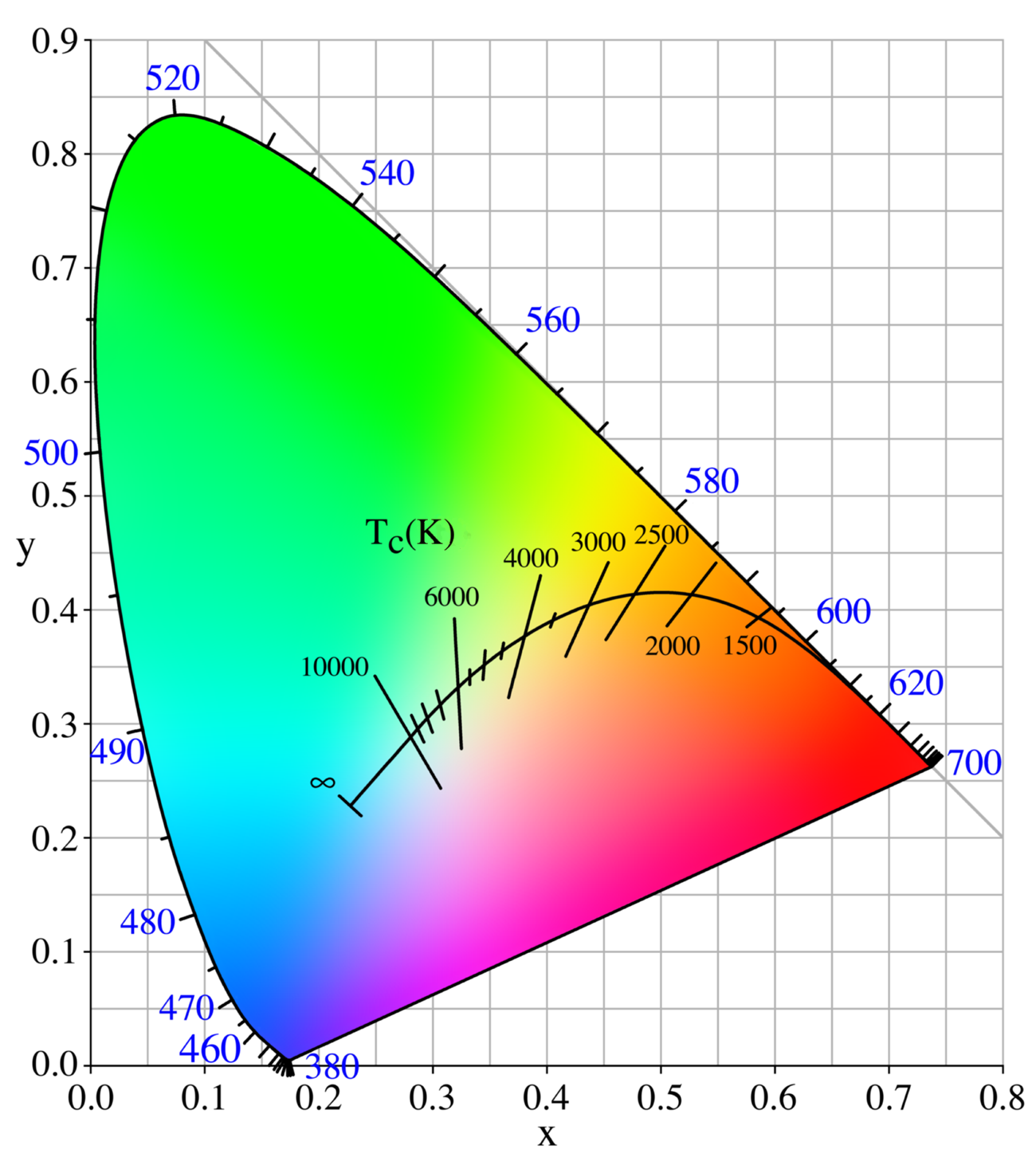
Planckian locus in the CIE 1931 chromaticity diagram

In physics and color science, the Planckian locus, or black body locus, is the path, or locus, that the color of an incandescent black body would take in a particular chromaticity space as the blackbody temperature changes. It goes from deep red at low temperatures through orange, yellowish, white, and finally bluish white at very high temperatures.

A color space is a three-dimensional space; that is, a color is specified by a set of three numbers (the CIE coordinates X, Y, and Z, for example, or other values such as hue, colorfulness, and luminance) which specify the perceived attributes of a particular homogeneous visual stimulus. A chromaticity is a color projected into a two-dimensional space that ignores brightness. For example, the standard CIE XYZ color space projects directly to the corresponding chromaticity space specified by the two chromaticity coordinates known as x and y, making the familiar chromaticity diagram shown in the figure. The Planckian locus, the path that the color of a black body takes as the blackbody temperature changes, is often shown in this standard chromaticity space.

== Planckian locus in the XYZ color space ==
CIE 1931 Standard Colorimetric Observer functions used to map blackbody spectra to XYZ coordinates

In the CIE XYZ color space, the three coordinates defining a color are given by X, Y, and Z:

$$X_T = \int_\lambda X(\lambda)M(\lambda,T)\,d\lambda$$
$$Y_T = \int_\lambda Y(\lambda)M(\lambda,T)\,d\lambda$$
$$Z_T = \int_\lambda Z(\lambda)M(\lambda,T)\,d\lambda$$

where M(λ,T) is the spectral radiant exitance of the light being viewed, and X(λ), Y(λ) and Z(λ) are the color matching functions of the CIE standard colorimetric observer, shown in the diagram on the right, and λ is the wavelength. The Planckian locus is determined by substituting into the above equations the black body spectral radiant exitance, which is given by Planck's law:

$$M(\lambda,T) =\frac{c_{1}}{\lambda^5}\frac{1}{\exp\left(\frac{c_2}{{\lambda}T}\right)-1}$$

where:

c_{1} = $2\pi{hc^2}$ is the first radiation constant
c_{2} = $\frac{hc}{k}$ is the second radiation constant

and

M is the black body spectral radiant exitance (power per unit area per unit wavelength: watt per square meter per meter (W/m^{3}))
T is the temperature of the black body
h is the Planck constant
c is the speed of light
k is the Boltzmann constant

This will give the Planckian locus in CIE XYZ color space. If these coordinates are X_{T}, Y_{T}, Z_{T} where T is the temperature, then the CIE chromaticity coordinates will be

$$x_T = \frac{X_T}{X_T+Y_T+Z_T}$$
$$y_T = \frac{Y_T}{X_T+Y_T+Z_T}$$

Note that in the above formula for Planck's Law, you might as well use c_{1L} = 2hc^{2} (the first radiation constant for spectral radiance) instead of c_{1} (the "regular" first radiation constant), in which case the formula would give the spectral radiance L(λ,T) of the black body instead of the spectral radiant exitance M(λ,T). However, this change only affects the absolute values of X_{T}, Y_{T} and Z_{T}, not the values relative to each other. Since X_{T}, Y_{T} and Z_{T} are usually normalized to Y_{T} = 1 (or Y_{T} = 100) and are normalized when x_{T} and y_{T} are calculated, the absolute values of X_{T}, Y_{T} and Z_{T} do not matter. For practical reasons, c_{1} might therefore simply be replaced by 1.

=== Approximation ===
The Planckian locus in xy space is depicted as a curve in the chromaticity diagram above. While it is possible to compute the CIE xy co-ordinates exactly given the above formulas, it is faster to use approximations. Since the mired scale changes more evenly along the locus than the temperature itself, it is common for such approximations to be functions of the reciprocal temperature. Kim et al. use a cubic spline:

$$x_\text{c}=\begin{cases}
-0.2661239 \frac{10^9}{T^3} - 0.2343580 \frac{10^6}{T^2} + 0.8776956 \frac{10^3}{T} + 0.179910 & 1667\,\text{K} \leq T \leq 4000\,\text{K} \\
-3.0258469 \frac{10^9}{T^3} + 2.1070379 \frac{10^6}{T^2} + 0.2226347 \frac{10^3}{T} + 0.240390 & 4000\,\text{K} \leq T \leq 25000\,\text{K}
\end{cases}$$
$$y_\text{c}=\begin{cases}
-1.1063814 x_\text{c}^3 - 1.34811020 x_\text{c}^2 + 2.18555832 x_\text{c} - 0.20219683 & 1667\,\text{K} \leq T \leq 2222\,\text{K} \\
-0.9549476 x_\text{c}^3 - 1.37418593 x_\text{c}^2 + 2.09137015 x_\text{c} - 0.16748867 & 2222\,\text{K} \leq T \leq 4000\,\text{K} \\
+3.0817580 x_\text{c}^3 - 5.87338670 x_\text{c}^2 + 3.75112997 x_\text{c} - 0.37001483 & 4000\,\text{K} \leq T \leq 25000\,\text{K}
\end{cases}$$

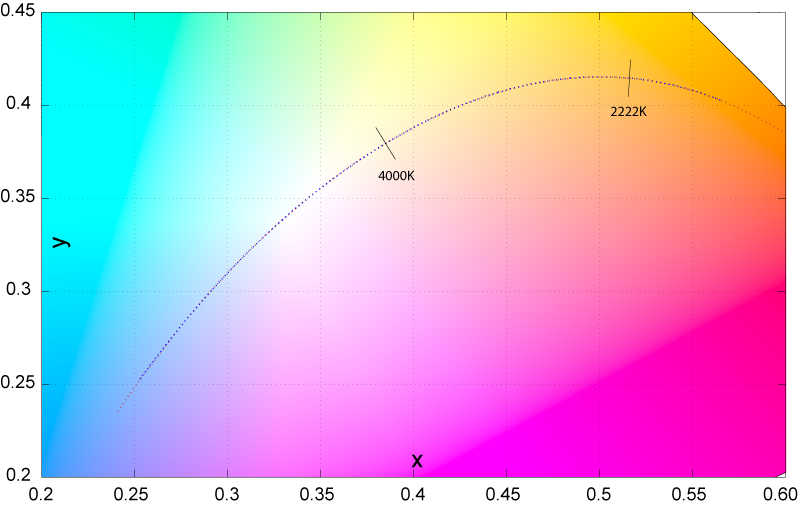
Kim et al.'s approximation to the Planckian locus (shown in red). The notches demarcate the three splines (shown in blue).

Animation showing an approximation of the color of the Planckian Locus through the visible spectrum

The Planckian locus can also be approximated in the CIE 1960 color space, which is used to compute CCT and CRI, using the following expressions:

$$\bar{u}(T)=\frac{0.860117757+1.54118254 \times 10^{-4}T + 1.28641212 \times 10^{-7} T^2}{1+8.42420235 \times 10^{-4}T + 7.08145163 \times 10^{-7}T^2}$$
$$\bar{v}(T)=\frac{0.317398726+4.22806245 \times 10^{-5}T + 4.20481691 \times 10^{-8} T^2}{1-2.89741816 \times 10^{-5}T+1.61456053 \times 10^{-7}T^2}$$

This approximation is accurate to within $\left| u-\bar{u} \right|$ < 8×10^{−5} and $\left|v-\bar{v}\right|$ < 9×10^{−5} for 1000 K < T < 15000 K. Alternatively, one can use the chromaticity (x, y) coordinates estimated from above to derive the corresponding (u, v), if a larger range of temperatures is required.

The inverse calculation, from chromaticity co-ordinates (x, y) on or near the Planckian locus to correlated color temperature, is discussed in Correlated color temperature § Approximation.

The color of an infinitely hot blackbody.
#94b1ff

=== Infinite temperature ===
The Planckian locus terminates at CIE xy coordinates (0.2399, 0.2340), or an sRGB value of (148, 177, 255) or #94b1ff, a light blue color known as perano. This is because of the Rayleigh-Jeans law, which states that at frequencies much lower than the peak frequency of a black-body radiator, spectral power is inversely proportional to the fourth power of the wavelength. As a black-body's temperature approaches infinity, its color converges to the aforementioned shade of blue.

== Correlated color temperature ==
The correlated color temperature (T_{cp}) is the temperature of the Planckian radiator whose perceived colour most closely resembles that of a given stimulus at the same brightness and under specified viewing conditions

— CIE/IEC 17.4:1987, International Lighting Vocabulary (ISBN 3900734070)

The mathematical procedure for determining the correlated color temperature involves finding the closest point to the light source's white point on the Planckian locus. Since the CIE's 1959 meeting in Brussels, the Planckian locus has been computed using the CIE 1960 color space, also known as MacAdam's (u,v) diagram. Today, the CIE 1960 color space is deprecated for other purposes:

The 1960 UCS diagram and 1964 Uniform Space are declared obsolete recommendation in CIE 15.2 (1986), but have been retained for the time being for calculating colour rendering indices and correlated colour temperature.

— CIE 13.3 (1995), Method of Measuring and Specifying Colour Rendering Properties of Light Sources

Owing to the perceptual inaccuracy inherent to the concept, it suffices to calculate to within 2 K at lower CCTs and 10 K at higher CCTs to reach the threshold of imperceptibility.

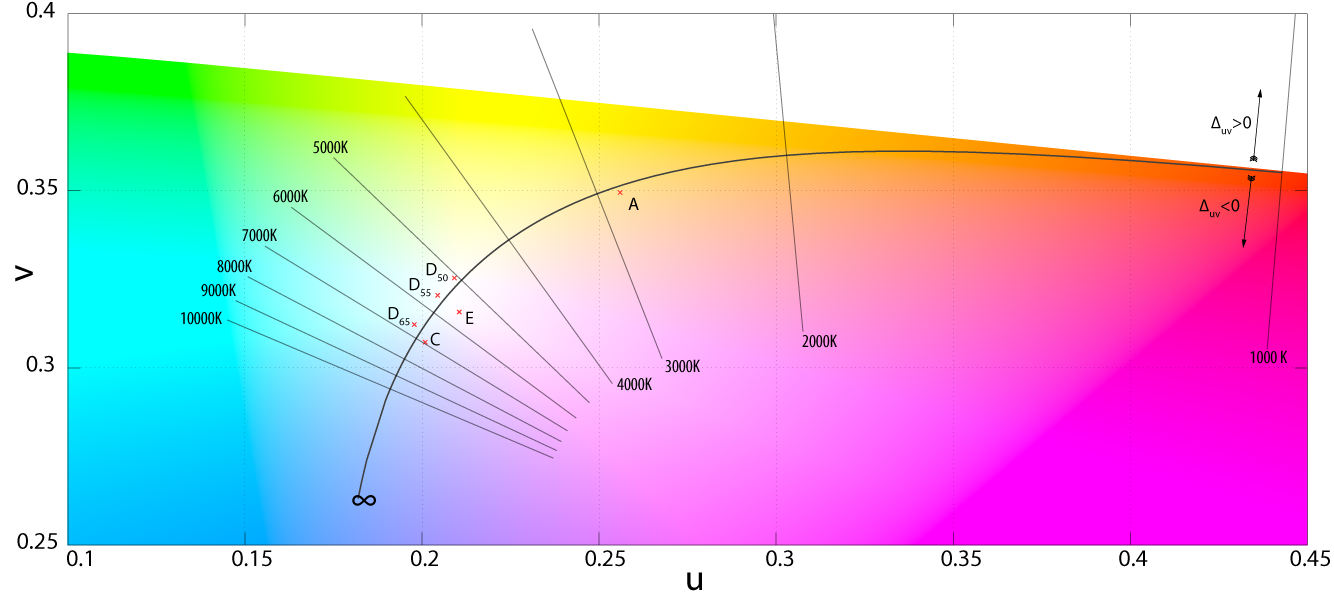
Close up of the CIE 1960 UCS. The isotherms are perpendicular to the Planckian locus, and are drawn to indicate the maximum distance from the locus that the CIE considers the correlated color temperature to be meaningful: Δ_{uv} = ±0.05.

=== International temperature scale ===
The Planckian locus is derived by determining the chromaticity values of a Planckian radiator using the standard colorimetric observer. The relative spectral power distribution (SPD) of a Planckian radiator follows Planck's law, and depends on the second radiation constant, {{{1}}}. As measuring techniques have improved, the General Conference on Weights and Measures has revised its estimate of this constant, with the International Temperature Scale (and briefly, the International Practical Temperature Scale). These successive revisions caused a shift in the Planckian locus and, as a result, the correlated color temperature scale. Before ceasing publication of standard illuminants, the CIE worked around this problem by explicitly specifying the form of the SPD, rather than making references to black bodies and a color temperature. Nevertheless, it is useful to be aware of previous revisions in order to be able to verify calculations made in older texts:

- $c_2$ = 1.432×10^{−2} m·K (ITS-27). Note: Was in effect during the standardization of Illuminants A, B, C (1931), however the CIE used the value recommended by the U.S. National Bureau of Standards, 1.435×10^{−2}
- $c_2$ = 1.4380×10^{−2} m·K (IPTS-48), in effect for Illuminant series D (formalized in 1967)
- $c_2$ = 1.4388×10^{−2} m·K (ITS-68), (ITS-90), often used in recent papers
- $c_2$ = 1.4387770(13)×10^{−2} m·K (CODATA 2010)
- $c_2$ = 1.43877736(83)×10^{−2} m·K (CODATA 2014)
- $c_2$ = 1.438776877...×10^{−2} m·K (CODATA 2018), the current value, as of 2020 – the 2019 revision of the SI fixed the Boltzmann constant to an exact value. Since the Planck constant and the speed of light were already fixed to exact values, with the consequence that that c_{2} now has an exact value. Note that the '...' indicates that of this exact value only the first ten digits are shown.

== See also ==
- Ultraviolet catastrophe
