= Impossible color =

Color that cannot be perceived under ordinary viewing conditions

The human eye's red-to-green and blue-to-yellow values of each one-wavelength visible color

Human color sensation is defined by the sensitivity curves (shown here normalized) of the three kinds of cone cells: respectively the short-, medium- and long-wavelength types.

Impossible colors are colors that do not appear in ordinary visual functioning. Different color theories suggest different hypothetical colors that humans are incapable of perceiving for one reason or another, and fictional colors are routinely created in popular culture. While some such colors have no basis in reality, phenomena such as cone cell fatigue enable colors to be perceived in certain circumstances that would not be otherwise.

== Opponent process ==
The color opponent process is a color theory that states that the human visual system interprets information about color by processing signals from cone and rod cells in an antagonistic manner. The three types of cone cells have some overlap in the wavelengths of light to which they respond, so it is more efficient for the visual system to record differences between the responses of cones, rather than each type of cone's individual response. The opponent color theory suggests that there are three opponent channels:

- Red versus green
- Blue versus yellow
- Black versus white (this is achromatic and detects light–dark variation or luminance)

Responses to one color of an opponent channel are antagonistic to those of the other color, and signals output from a place on the retina can contain one or the other but not both, for each opponent pair.

== Imaginary colors ==
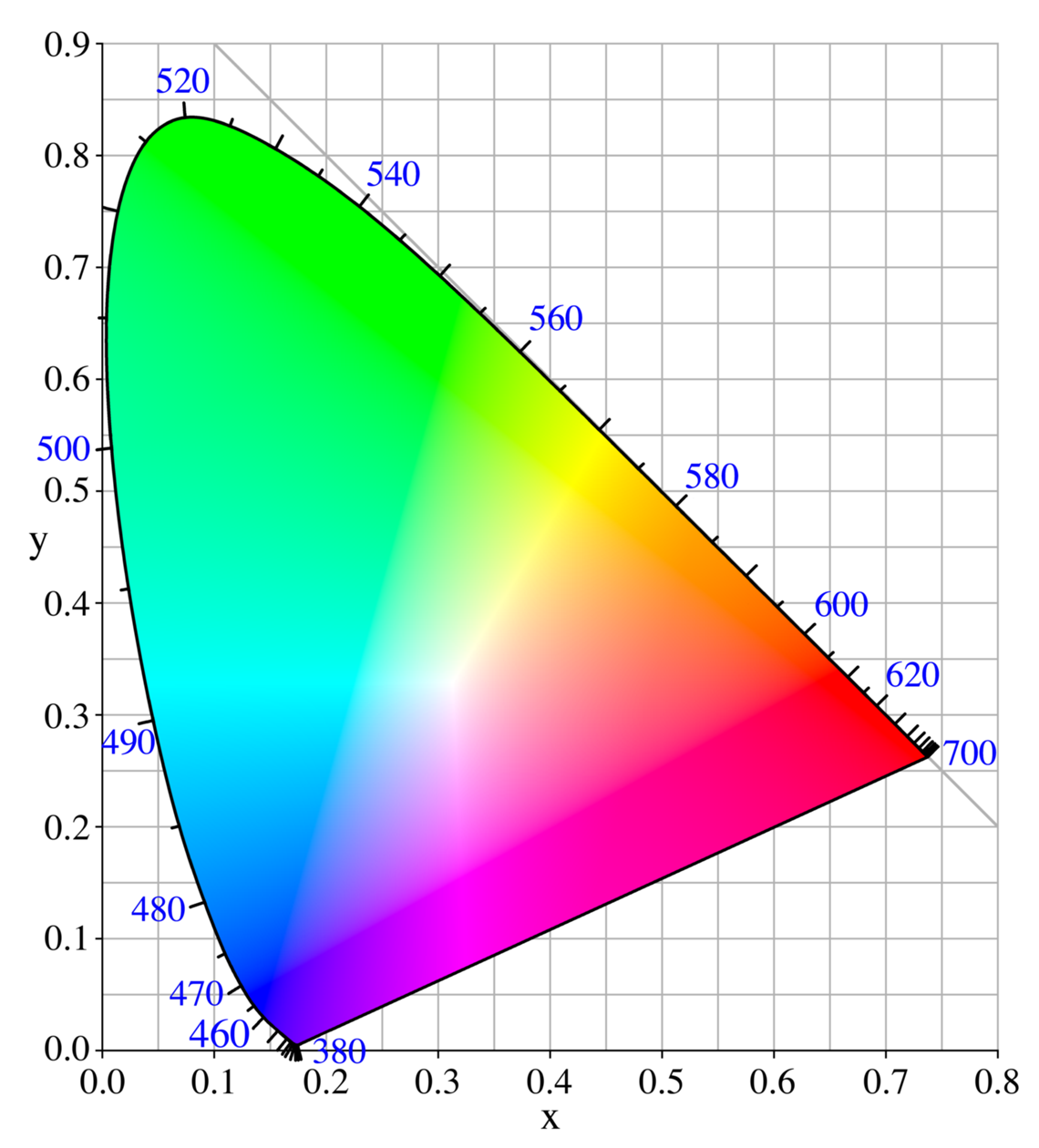
The CIE 1931 color space chromaticity diagram. The white regions outside the black line correspond to imaginary colors. (The colors in this figure do not reproduce the actual colors in the diagram, due to the limitations of RGB computer displays.)

The ProPhoto RGB color space uses fictitious green and blue primaries to obtain a broader gamut (space inside the triangle) than would be possible with three realistic primaries. However, some realistic colors still cannot be rendered using the colorants that are available.

A fictitious color or imaginary color is a point in a color space that corresponds to combinations of cone cell responses in one eye that cannot be produced by the eye in normal circumstances seeing any possible light spectrum. No physical object, perceived by the normal process of vision, can have an imaginary color.

The spectral sensitivity curve of medium-wavelength (M) cone cells overlaps those of short-wavelength (S) and long-wavelength (L) cone cells. Light of any wavelength that interacts with M cones also interacts with S or L cones, or both, to some extent. Therefore, no wavelength and no spectral power distribution excites only the M cones.

A physically realizable stimulus can, unlike the case with the M cones, excite only the L or only the S cones. This can be done using bright lights whose wavelength lies at the very extremes of the visible spectrum. A lightsource that emits light with a wavelength of around 800 nm will exclusively excite the L cones. A lightsource that emits light with a wavelength of around 360 nm will exclusively excite the S cones. As one of the extremes is approached, the signal becomes purer and purer.

=== Olo ===
If M cones were excited alone, an imaginary color greener than any physically possible green would be perceived. Such a "hyper-green" falls, on the CIE 1931 xy chromaticity diagram and according to CIE 2006 LMS, on the xy coordinates (1.3267164, -0.3267164); below and to the right of the visible gamut on the diagram. In April 2025, a research group reported achieving exactly this, by using an imaging system to scan the retina and a steerable laser source to illuminate M cones exclusively. The color perceived by subjects matched the predicted sensation, describing the color as a blue-green of unprecedented saturation. It was named "olo", after its coordinates (0, 1, 0) in LMS color space. However, there is some disagreement as to whether olo is really a new color. Approximations to olo may be seen by the opponent-fatigue process, as demonstrated by other hypersaturated colors such as hyperbolic orange, described under "Chimerical Colors" below.

=== Imaginary colors in color spaces ===
Although they cannot be seen in normal vision, imaginary colors are often found in the mathematical descriptions that define color spaces.

Any additive mixture of two real colors is also a real color. When colors are displayed in the CIE 1931 XYZ color space, additive mixture results in color along the line between the colors being mixed. By mixing any three colors, one can therefore create any color contained in the triangle they describe – this is called the gamut formed by those three colors, which are called primary colors. Any colors outside of this triangle cannot be obtained by mixing the chosen primaries. But because bird vision has tetrachromacy (possessing four color cones) compared to humans' three, they can perceive ultraviolet (UV) light and combine it with other colors to see a significantly broader color spectrum.

When defining primaries, the goal is often to leave as many real colors in gamut as possible. Since the region of real colors is not a triangle (see illustration), it is not possible to pick three real colors that span the whole region. The gamut can be increased by selecting more than three real primary colors, but since the region of real colors is bounded by a smooth curve, there will always be some colors near its edges that are left out. For this reason, primary colors are often chosen that are outside of the region of real colors – that is, imaginary or fictitious primary colors – in order to capture the greatest area of real colors.

In computer and television screen color displays, the corners of the gamut triangle are defined by commercially available phosphors chosen to be as near as possible to pure red, green, and blue, within the area of real colors. Because of this, these displays inevitably exhibit colors nearest to real colors lying within its gamut triangle, rather than exact matches to real colors that plot outside of it. The specific gamuts available to commercial display devices vary by manufacturer and model and are often defined as part of international standards –for example, the gamut of chromaticities defined by sRGB color space was developed into a standard (IEC 61966-2-1:1999) by the International Electrotechnical Commission.

== Chimerical colors ==
By staring at a "fatigue template" for 20–60 seconds, then switching to a neutral target, it is possible to view "impossible" colors.

A chimerical color is an imaginary color that can be seen temporarily by looking steadily at a strong color until some of the cone cells become fatigued, temporarily changing their color sensitivities, and then looking at a markedly different color. The direct trichromatic description of vision cannot explain these colors, which can involve saturation signals outside the physical gamut imposed by the trichromatic model. Opponent process color theories, which treat intensity and chroma as separate visual signals, provide a biophysical explanation of these chimerical colors. For example, staring at a saturated primary-color field and then looking at a white object results in an opposing shift in hue, causing an afterimage of the complementary color. Exploration of the color space outside the range of "real colors" by this means has been regarded as a major corroborating evidence for the opponent-process theory of color vision (although as late as the 19th century this was not fully understood, leaving the field open to speculation). Chimerical colors can be seen while seeing with one eye or with both eyes, and are not observed to reproduce simultaneously qualities of opposing colors (e.g. "yellowish blue"). Chimerical colors include:

Stygian colors
These are simultaneously dark and impossibly saturated. For example, to see "stygian blue": staring at bright yellow causes a dark blue afterimage, then on looking at black, the blue is seen as blue against the black, also as dark as the black. The color is not possible to achieve through normal vision, because the lack of incident light (in the black) prevents saturation of the blue/yellow chromatic signal (the blue appearance).
Self-luminous colors
These mimic the effect of glowing material, even when viewed on a medium such as paper, which can only reflect and not emit its own light. For example, to see "self-luminous red": staring at green causes a red afterimage, then on looking at white, the red is seen against the white and may seem to be brighter than the white.
Hyperbolic colors
These are impossibly highly saturated. For example, to see "hyperbolic orange": staring at bright cyan causes an orange afterimage, then on looking at orange, the resulting orange afterimage seen against the orange background may cause an orange color purer than the purest orange color that can be made by any normally seen light.

== Colors outside physical color space ==
Some people may be able to see the color "yellow–blue" in this image by letting their eyes cross so that both + symbols are on top of each other. In this image, both RGB and Natural Color System color pairs are provided. It may be necessary to zoom to adjust the image.

Some people may be able to see the color "red–green" in this image by letting their eyes cross so that both + symbols are on top of each other. In this image, both RGB and Natural Color System color pairs are provided. It may be necessary to zoom to adjust the image.

Most people see very bright colored concentric circles in this pattern, if it is printed and rotated at around 150–300 rpm. Alternate version with inverse contrast yields opposite effect. This is known as the Fechner color effect

According to the opponent-process theory, under normal circumstances, there is no hue that could be described as a mixture of opponent hues; that is, as a hue looking "redgreen" or "yellowblue".

In 1983, Hewitt D. Crane and Thomas P. Piantanida performed tests using an eye-tracker device that had a field of a vertical red stripe adjacent to a vertical green stripe, or several narrow alternating red and green stripes (or in some cases, yellow and blue instead). The device could track involuntary movements of one eye (there was a patch over the other eye) and adjust mirrors so the image would follow the eye and the boundaries of the stripes were always on the same places on the eye's retina; the field outside the stripes was blanked with occluders. Under such conditions, the edges between the stripes seemed to disappear (perhaps due to edge-detecting neurons becoming fatigued) and the colors flowed into each other in the brain's visual cortex, overriding the opponency mechanisms and producing not the color expected from mixing paints or from mixing lights on a screen, but new colors entirely, which are not in the CIE 1931 color space, either in its real part or in its imaginary parts. For red-and-green, some saw an even field of the new color; some saw a regular pattern of just-visible green dots and red dots; some saw islands of one color on a background of the other color. Some of the volunteers for the experiment reported that afterward, they could still imagine the new colors for a period of time.

Some observers indicated that although they were aware that what they were viewing was a color (that is, the field was not achromatic), they were unable to name or describe the color. One of these observers was an artist with large color vocabulary. Other observers of the novel hues described the first stimulus as a reddish-green.

In 2001, Vincent A. Billock and Gerald A. Gleason and Brian H. Tsou set up an experiment to test a theory that the 1983 experiment did not control for variations in the perceived luminance of the colors from subject to subject: two colors are equiluminant for an observer when rapidly alternating between the colors produces the least impression of flickering. The 2001 experiment was similar but controlled for luminance. They had these observations:

Some subjects (4 out of 7) described transparency phenomena – as though the opponent colors originated in two depth planes and could be seen, one through the other. ...

On occasion (4 out of 7 subjects) the percept was a homogeneous mixture color whose red and green components were as clear and as compelling as the red and blue components of a purple. This percept tended to last longer than the gradient phenomenon.

We found that when colors were equiluminant, subjects saw reddish greens, bluish yellows, or a multistable spatial color exchange (an entirely novel perceptual phenomena [sic]); when the colors were nonequiluminant, subjects saw spurious pattern formation.

This led them to propose a "soft-wired model of cortical color opponency", in which populations of neurons compete to fire and in which the "losing" neurons go completely silent. In this model, eliminating competition by, for instance, inhibiting connections between neural populations can allow mutually exclusive neurons to fire together.

=== Binocular rivalry ===
Hsieh and Tse in 2006 disputed the existence of colors forbidden by opponency theory and claimed they are, in reality, intermediate colors. However, by their own account their methods differed from Crane and Piantanida: "They stabilized the border between two colors on the retina using an eye tracker linked to deflector mirrors, whereas we relied on visual fixation." Hsieh and Tse do not compare their methods to Billock and Tsou, and do not cite their work, even though it was published five years earlier in 2001.

== In fiction ==
Some works of fiction have mentioned fictional colors outside of the normal human visual spectrum that have not been observed yet and whose observation may require advanced technology, different physics, or magic. Introduction of a new color is often an allegory intending to deliver additional information to the reader. Such colors are primarily discussed in literary works, as they are currently impossible to visualize (when a new color is shown in the episode "Reincarnation" of the animated show Futurama, the animation for that segment of the show is purposely kept in shades of gray).

- One of the earliest examples of fictional colors comes from the Ambrose Bierce 1893 horror short story "The Damned Thing", wherein the titular monster is theorized to have been a color beyond human senses, rendering the monster itself invisible.
- The 1920 science fiction novel A Voyage to Arcturus by David Lindsay, mentions two new primary colors, "ulfire" and "jale".
- "The Colour Out of Space", a 1927 story by H.P. Lovecraft, is named after an otherwise unnamed color, usually not observable by humans, generated by alien entities.
- Marion Zimmer Bradley in her novel The Colors of Space (1963) mentions "the eighth color" made visible during the FTL travel.
- Philip K. Dick's 1969 novel Galactic Pot-Healer mentions a color "rej".
- Brazilian writer Ziraldo's 1969 children's book Flicts tells the story of a color of the same name (represented as an earthy shade of beige) that is segregated by the other colors found in the rainbow, flags and elsewhere, because flicts is rare, seen as uncharacteristic, and therefore undervalued; at the end of the book, flicts finds its place as the color of the moon. (After being gifted an English copy of the book, Neil Armstrong signed it and wrote "The moon is flicts.")
- Garry Kilworth's 1982 story "Blind Windows" involves a search for a fourth primary color.
- Terry Pratchett, in his Discworld series that began with The Colour of Magic (1983), describes the eighth color "octarine", resembling a "fluorescent greenish-yellow purple" color, which can be seen only by wizards and cats.
- Vernor Vinge's science fiction novel A Deepness in the Sky includes a species who can see a color whose name is translated as "plaid" (including a reference to "alpha plaid").
- In Fallen London (2009), Sunless Sea (2015), and Sunless Skies (2019), which take place in a shared universe created by Failbetter Games, there exist seven colors as part of a "Neathbow" that cannot be viewed in plain sunlight, are counterparts to regular colors, and have fantastical properties, such as "irrigo" and "violant", which remove and reinforce memories, respectively.
- King Gizzard & the Lizard Wizard's 2017 album Polygondwanaland is partially themed about an unnamed protagonist's journey to be able to see ultraviolet light.
- "Pleurigloss" is the favorite color of the immortal afterlife-being Michael from the 2020 television show The Good Place. In the show, pleurigloss is described as "the color of when a soldier comes home from war and sees his dog for the first time".
- Midway through C. S. Lewis’s science-fiction novel PERELANDRA (the second book of his SPACE TRILOGY, the hero — an Earthman on a visit to Venus — encounters two paranormal beings whom he later describes to the narrator (a friend back on Earth) as having colors which Earthly humans see unless their brains are directly manipulated by such “hypersomatic” beings : “Their bodies, he said, were white. But a flush of diverse colours began at about the shoulders and streamed up the necks and flickered over face and head and stood out around the head like plumage or a halo. He told me he could in a sense remember these colours-that is, he would know them if he saw them again-but that he cannot by any effort call up a visual image of them nor give them any name. The very few people with whom he and I can discuss these matters all give the same explanation. We think that when creatures of the hypersomatic kind choose to ‘appear’ to us, they are not in fact affecting our retina at all, but directly manipulating the relevant parts of our brain. If so, it is quite possible that they can produce there the sensations we should have if our eyes were capable of receiving those colours in the spectrum which are actually beyond their range.“

== See also ==
- Color mixing – Producing colors by combining the primary or secondary colors in different amounts
- Color vision – Ability to perceive differences in light frequency
- False-color image – Methods of visualizing information by translating to colors, an image that depicts an object in colors that differ from those that a visible-colors-only photograph would show.
- Middle gray – Shade of the color gray used to adjust photographs to match perceptual brightness, as opposed to absolute brightness as measured by a digital camera.
- Olo – Imaginary color produced by isolating M cone responses
- Non-visible electromagnetic waves, such as radio waves, microwaves, X-rays, etc.
- Shades of Grey – 2009 novel by Jasper Fforde, a novel where social class is determined by the specific colors that one can see
- Spectral color – Color evoked by a single wavelength of light in the visible spectrum
- Tetrachromacy – Type of color vision with four types of cone cells, having four primary colors
