= Shades of yellow =

Varieties of the color yellow

Yellow
- Wavelength: 570–580 nm

Common connotations
- happiness, sunlight, cowardice, summer, Easter

Color coordinates
- Hex triplet: #FFFF00
- sRGB^{B} (r, g, b): (255, 255, 0)
- HSV (h, s, v): (60°, 100%, 100%)
- CIELCh_{uv} (L, C, h): (97, 107, 86°)
- Source: HTML/CSS
- B: Normalized to [0–255] (byte)

Varieties of the color yellow may differ in hue, chroma (also called saturation, intensity, or colorfulness) or lightness (or value, tone, or brightness), or in two or three of these qualities. Variations in value are also called tints and shades, a tint being a yellow or other hue mixed with white, a shade being mixed with black. A large selection of these various colors is shown below.

== Web colors ==
=== Yellow (RGB) (X11 yellow) (color wheel yellow) ===
Yellow (RGB) (X11 yellow)

Color coordinates
- Hex triplet: #FFFF00
- sRGB^{B} (r, g, b): (255, 255, 0)
- HSV (h, s, v): (60°, 100%, 100%)
- CIELCh_{uv} (L, C, h): (97, 107, 86°)
- Source: X11
- ISCC–NBS descriptor: Vivid greenish yellow
- B: Normalized to [0–255] (byte)

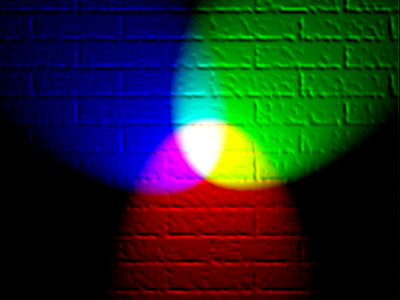
Red, green and blue lights, representing the three basic additive primary colors of the RGB color system, red, green, and blue. Pure yellow light is composed of equal amount of red and green light.

The color box at right shows the most intense yellow representable in 8-bit RGB color model; yellow is a secondary color in an additive RGB space.

This color is also called color wheel yellow. It is at precisely 60 degrees on the HSV color wheel, also known as the RGB color wheel. Its complementary color is blue.

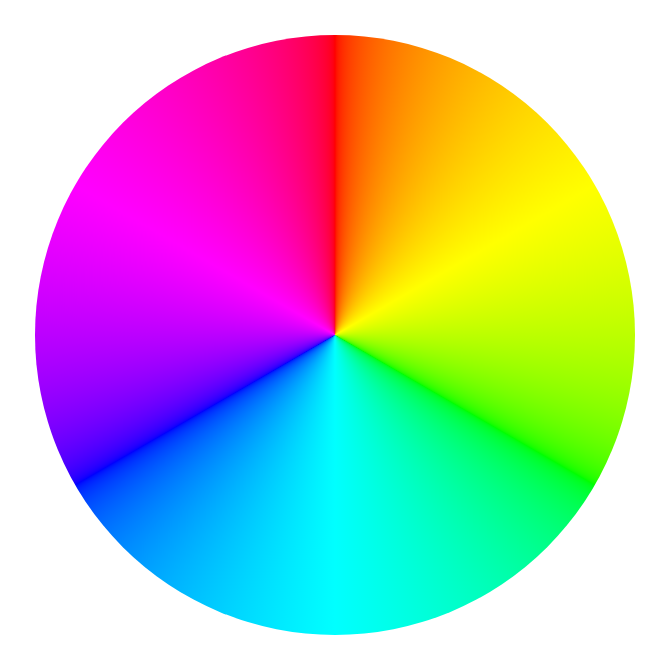
The RGB color wheel with yellow at 60 degrees.

=== Yellow (CMYK) (process yellow) (canary yellow) ===
Cyan, magenta, and yellow are the three subtractive primary colors used in printing.

Process yellow (also called pigment yellow or printer's yellow), also known as canary yellow, is one of the three colors typically used as subtractive primary colors, along with magenta and cyan. Canary yellow is derived from the colour of an average canary bird, though canaries can vary in colour from dark yellow to light pink.

Process yellow is not an RGB color, and in the CMYK color model there is no fixed conversion from CMYK primaries to RGB. Different formulations are used for printer's ink, so there can be variations in the printed color that is pure yellow ink.

The first recorded use of canary yellow as a color name in English was in 1789.

=== Yellow (NCS) (psychological primary yellow) ===
Yellow (NCS)

Color coordinates
- Hex triplet: #FFD300
- sRGB^{B} (r, g, b): (255, 211, 0)
- HSV (h, s, v): (50°, 100%, 100%)
- CIELCh_{uv} (L, C, h): (86, 98, 67°)
- Source: sRGB approximation to NCS 0580-Y
- ISCC–NBS descriptor: Vivid yellow
- B: Normalized to [0–255] (byte)

Approximations within the sRGB gamut to the primary colors of the Natural Color System, a model based on the opponent process theory of color vision.

The color defined as yellow in the NCS or Natural Color System is shown at right (NCS 0580-Y). The Natural Color System is a color system based on the four unique hues or psychological primary colors red, yellow, green, and blue. The NCS is based on the opponent process theory of vision.

The “Natural Color System” is widely used in Scandinavia.

=== Yellow (Munsell) ===
Yellow (Munsell)
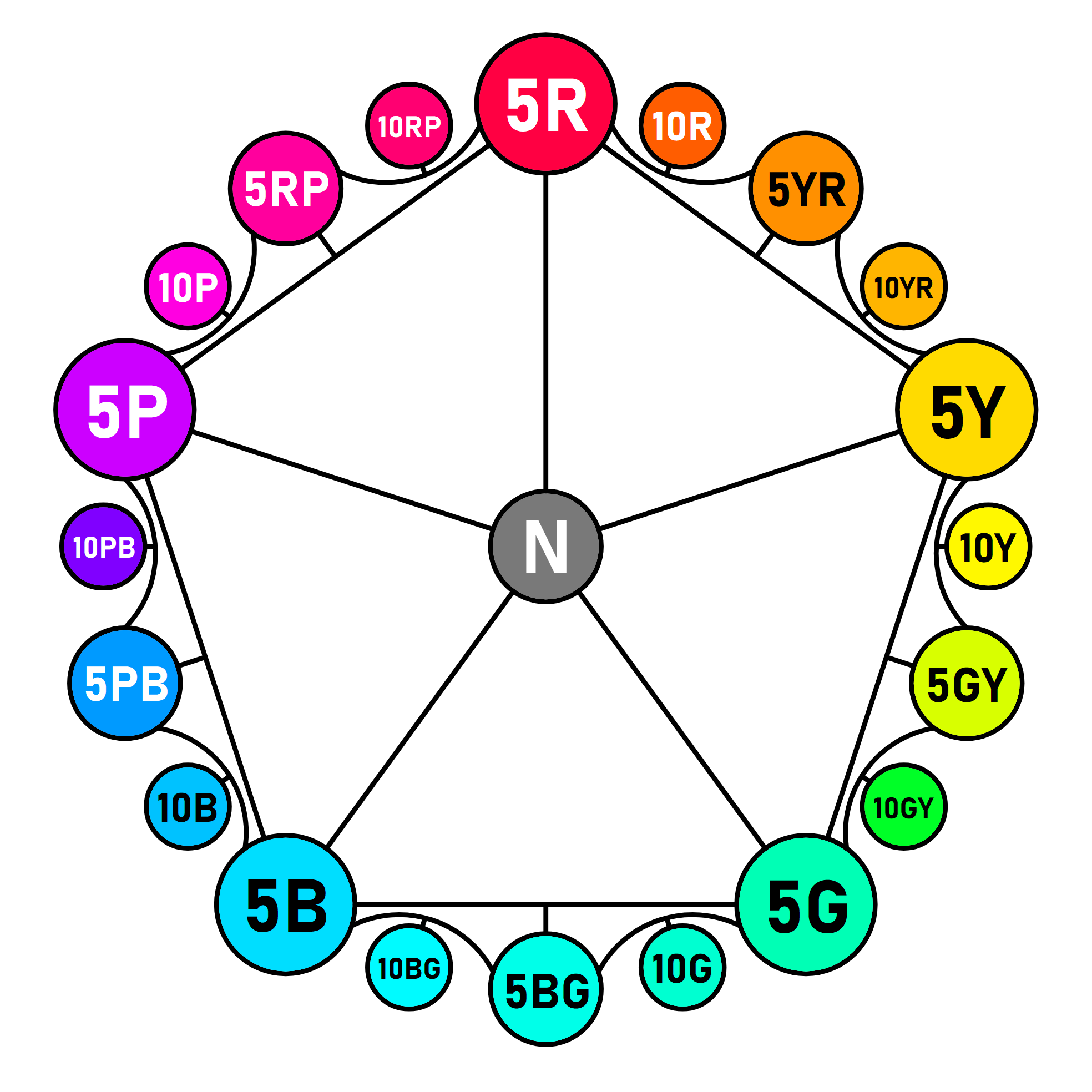
- The hues of the Munsell color system, at varying values, and maximum chroma to stay in the sRGB gamut

Color coordinates
- Hex triplet: #FFDB00
- sRGB^{B} (r, g, b): (255, 219, 0)
- HSV (h, s, v): (52°, 100%, 100%)
- CIELCh_{uv} (L, C, h): (88, 99, 71°)
- Source: https://pteromys.melonisland.net/munsell/
- ISCC–NBS descriptor: Vivid yellow
- B: Normalized to [0–255] (byte)

The Munsell color system is a color space that specifies colors based on three color dimensions: hue, value (lightness), and chroma (colorfulness), spaced uniformly (in terms of human perception) in three dimensions in the Munsell color solid. In order for all the colors to be spaced uniformly, it was found necessary to use a color wheel with five, non-arbitrary, equally spaced primary colors: red, yellow, green, blue, and purple.

The color of the sample is the most chromatic (colorful) yellow in the sRGB gamut that falls in the hue of 5Y (primary yellow) in the Munsell color space.

=== Yellow (Pantone) ===
Yellow (Pantone)

Color coordinates
- Hex triplet: #FEDF00
- sRGB^{B} (r, g, b): (254, 223, 0)
- HSV (h, s, v): (53°, 100%, 100%)
- CIELCh_{uv} (L, C, h): (89, 99, 73°)
- Source: Pantone TPX
- ISCC–NBS descriptor: Vivid yellow
- B: Normalized to [0–255] (byte)

The color that is called yellow in Pantone is displayed at right.

The source of this color is the "Pantone Textile Paper eXtended (TPX)" color list, color #C, EC, M, PC, U, or CP—Yellow.

== Tints of yellow ==
=== Cream ===
Cream
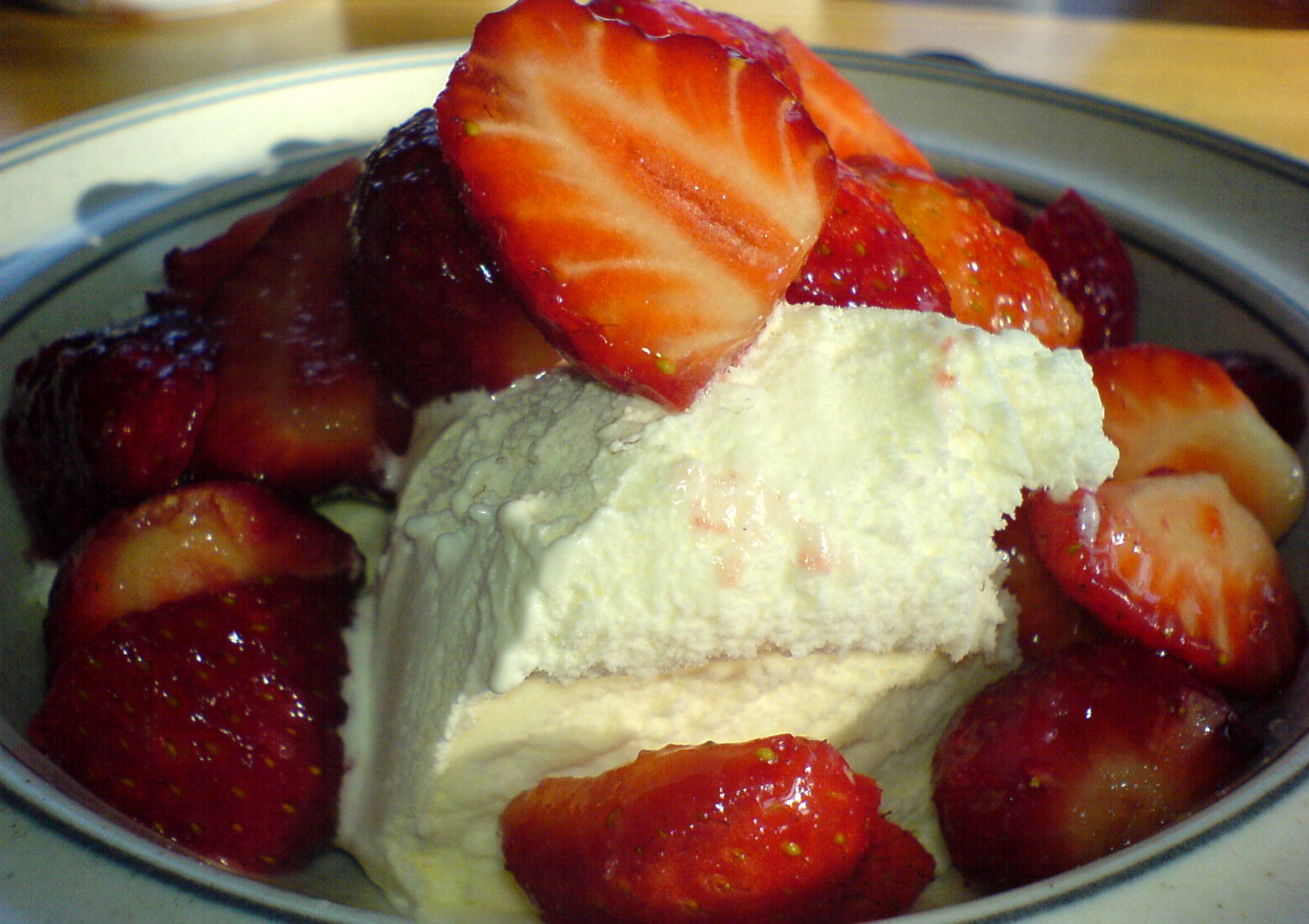
- Strawberries with cream

Color coordinates
- Hex triplet: #FFFFCC
- sRGB^{B} (r, g, b): (255, 255, 204)
- HSV (h, s, v): (60°, 20%, 100%)
- CIELCh_{uv} (L, C, h): (99, 37, 86°)
- Source: X11
- ISCC–NBS descriptor: Light yellow green
- B: Normalized to [0–255] (byte)

Displayed at right is the web color cream, a pale tint of yellow.

=== Lemon chiffon ===
Lemon chiffon
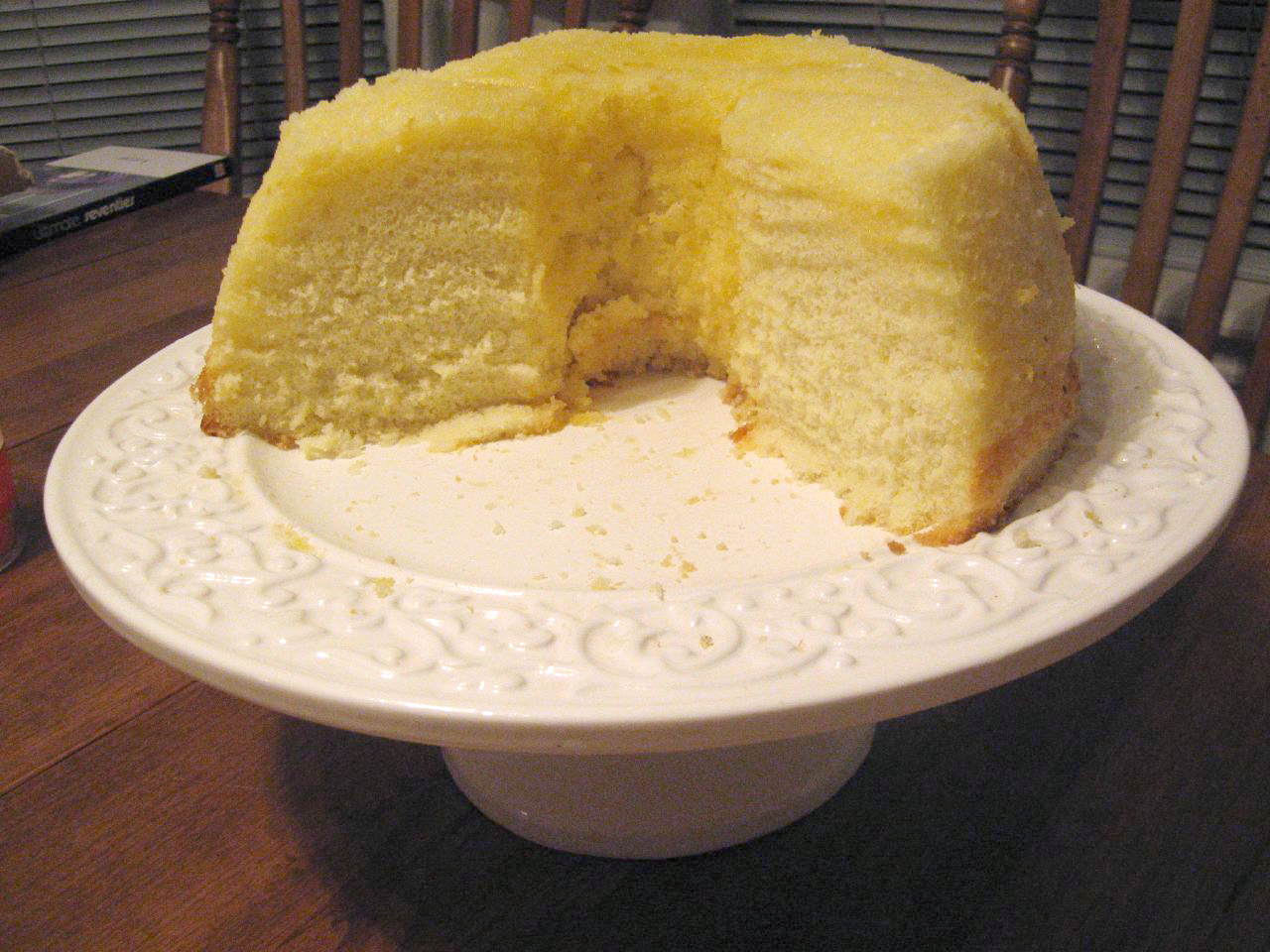
- A lemon chiffon cake

Color coordinates
- Hex triplet: #FFFACD
- sRGB^{B} (r, g, b): (255, 250, 205)
- HSV (h, s, v): (54°, 20%, 100%)
- CIELCh_{uv} (L, C, h): (98, 34, 81°)
- Source: X11
- ISCC–NBS descriptor: Pale greenish yellow
- B: Normalized to [0–255] (byte)

Displayed at right is the web color lemon chiffon.

Lemon chiffon is a color that is reminiscent of the color of lemon chiffon cake.

=== Light yellow ===
Light yellow

Color coordinates
- Hex triplet: #FFFFE0
- sRGB^{B} (r, g, b): (255, 255, 224)
- HSV (h, s, v): (60°, 12%, 100%)
- CIELCh_{uv} (L, C, h): (99, 23, 86°)
- Source: X11
- ISCC–NBS descriptor: Pale yellow green
- B: Normalized to [0–255] (byte)

Displayed at right is the web color light yellow.

== Additional definitions of yellow ==
=== Calamansi ===
Calamansi
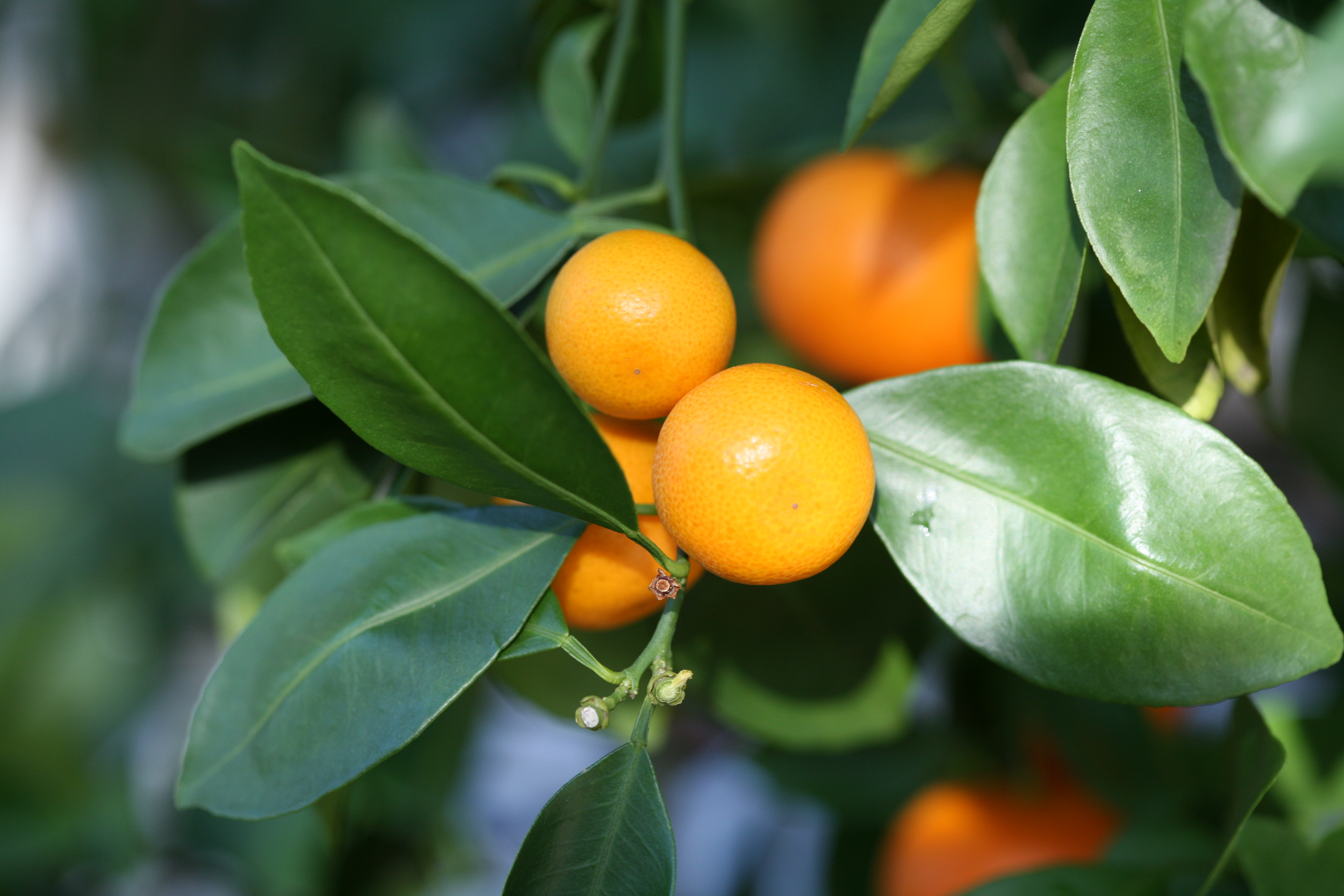
- Calamansi fruit

Color coordinates
- Hex triplet: #FCFFA4
- sRGB^{B} (r, g, b): (252, 255, 164)
- HSV (h, s, v): (62°, 36%, 100%)
- CIELCh_{uv} (L, C, h): (98, 62, 88°)
- Source: iColorpalette
- ISCC–NBS descriptor: Pale yellow green
- B: Normalized to [0–255] (byte)

The color calamansi with hexadecimal color code is a light shade of yellow-green.

=== Chartreuse yellow ===
Chartreuse yellow
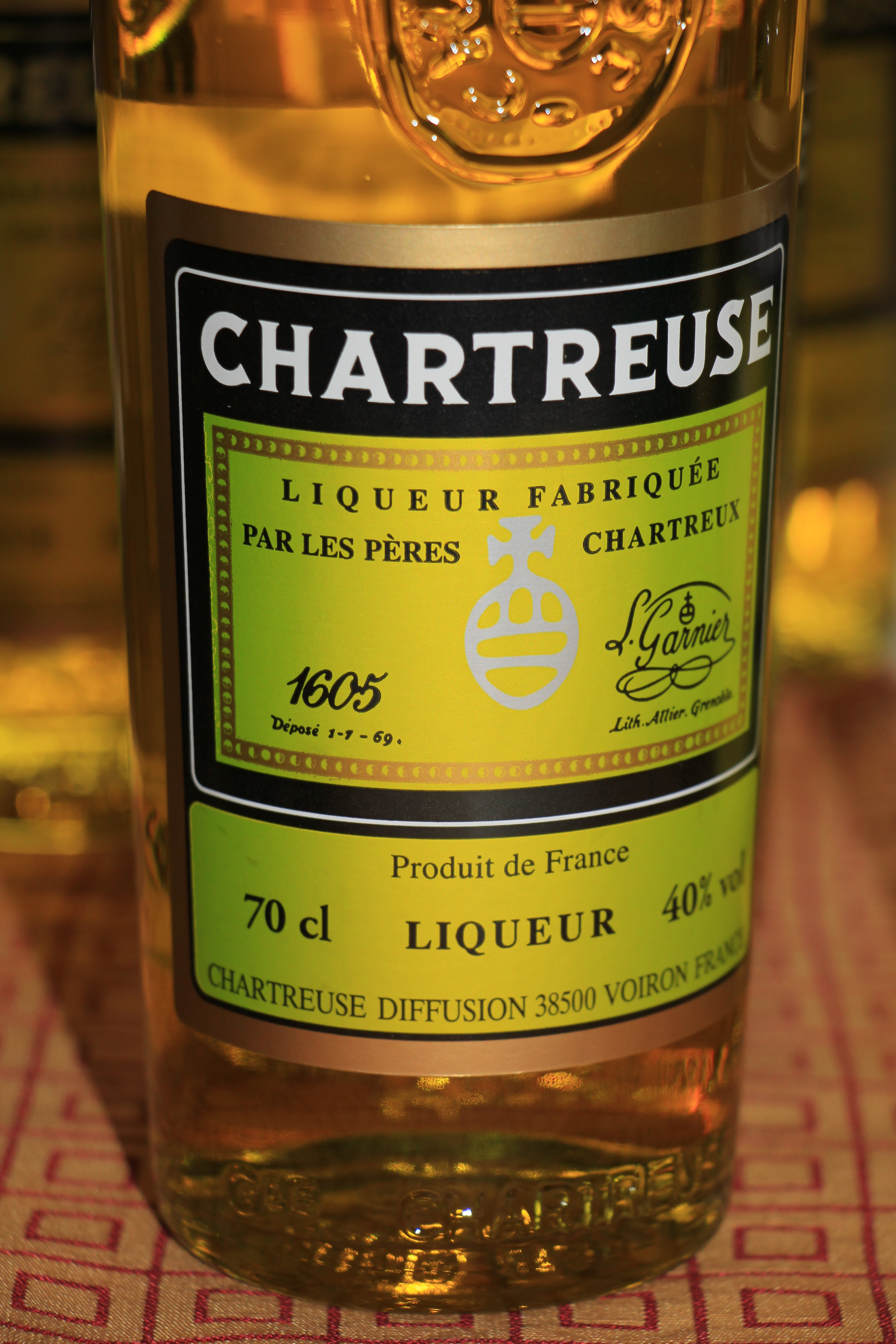
- A bottle of chartreuse liqueur

Color coordinates
- Hex triplet: #DFFF00
- sRGB^{B} (r, g, b): (223, 255, 0)
- HSV (h, s, v): (68°, 100%, 100%)
- CIELCh_{uv} (L, C, h): (95, 108, 97°)
- Source: Maerz and Paul
- ISCC–NBS descriptor: Vivid yellowish green
- B: Normalized to [0–255] (byte)

The first recorded use of chartreuse for the color that is now called chartreuse yellow in American English was in 1892.

In the book Color Standards and Color Nomenclature (1912), "Chartreuse Yellow" is listed and illustrated.

=== Cyber yellow ===
Cyber yellow
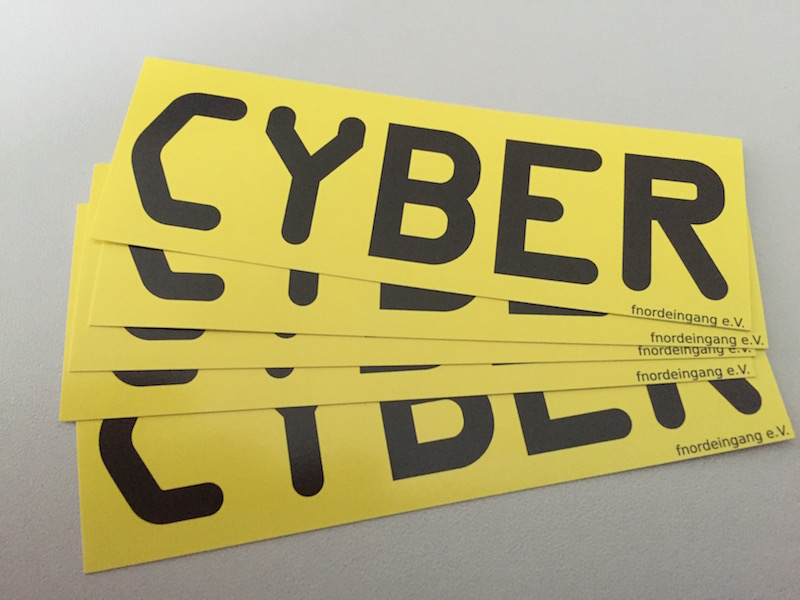
- Cyber yellow used for stickers

Color coordinates
- Hex triplet: #FFD300
- sRGB^{B} (r, g, b): (255, 211, 0)
- HSV (h, s, v): (50°, 100%, 100%)
- CIELCh_{uv} (L, C, h): (86, 98, 67°)
- Source: Pantone TPX
- ISCC–NBS descriptor: Vivid yellow
- B: Normalized to [0–255] (byte)

The color cyber yellow is displayed at right.

The source of this color is the "Pantone Textile Paper eXtended (TPX)" color list, color 14-0760 TPX—Cyber Yellow.

=== Gold (golden) ===
Gold (Golden)
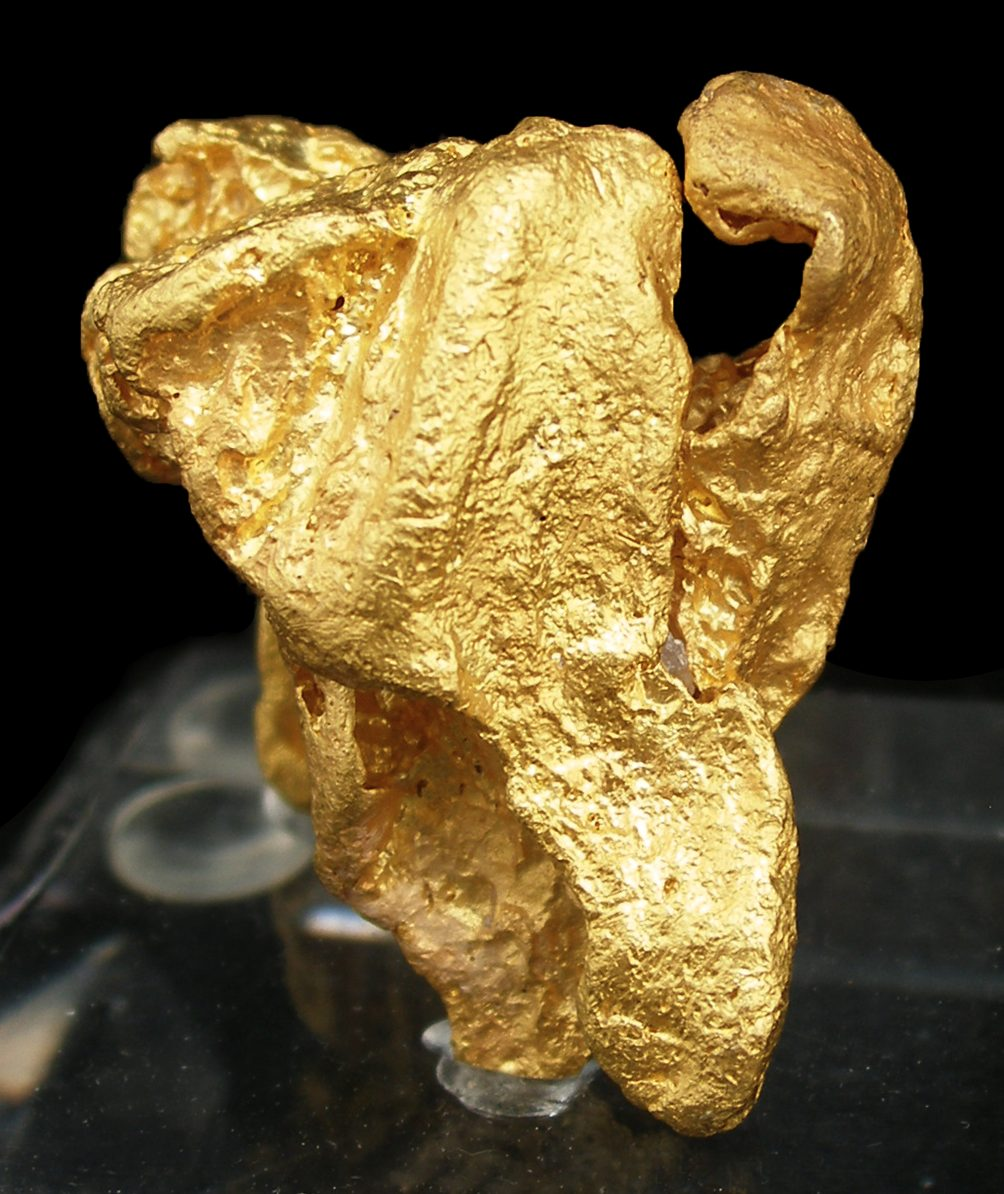
- A gold nugget

Color coordinates
- Hex triplet: #FFD700
- sRGB^{B} (r, g, b): (255, 215, 0)
- HSV (h, s, v): (51°, 100%, 100%)
- CIELCh_{uv} (L, C, h): (87, 99, 69°)
- Source: X11
- ISCC–NBS descriptor: Vivid yellow
- B: Normalized to [0–255] (byte)

Gold, also called golden, is a yellow-orange color which is a representation of the color of the element gold.

The web color gold (also referred to as orange-yellow) is sometimes referred to as golden to distinguish it from the color metallic gold. The use of gold as a color term in traditional usage is more often applied to the color "metallic gold".

The first recorded uses of golden as a color name in English were in 1300 to refer to the element gold and in 1423 to refer to blonde hair.

=== Green earth ===
Green earth

Color coordinates
- Hex triplet: #DADD98
- sRGB^{B} (r, g, b): (218, 221, 152)
- HSV (h, s, v): (63°, 31%, 87%)
- CIELCh_{uv} (L, C, h): (86, 48, 88°)
- Source: Derwent
- ISCC–NBS descriptor: Light yellow green
- B: Normalized to [0–255] (byte)

Displayed at right is the color green earth. It is also known as terre verte and Verona green. It is an inorganic pigment derived from the minerals celadonite and glauconite.

=== Greenish Yellow ===
Greenish yellow
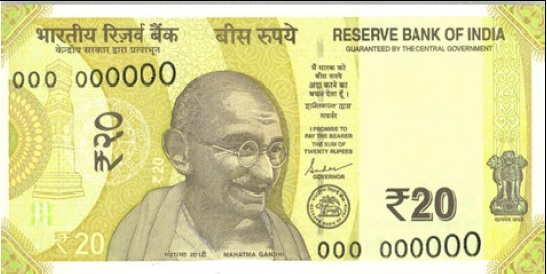
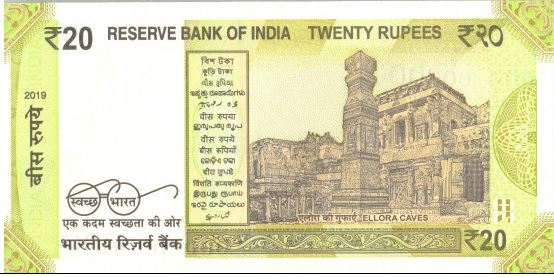
- Indian 20 rupee note, obverse and reverse

Color coordinates
- Hex triplet: #EEEA62
- sRGB^{B} (r, g, b): (238, 234, 98)
- HSV (h, s, v): (58°, 59%, 93%)
- CIELCh_{uv} (L, C, h): (91, 82, 84°)
- Source: Encycolorpedia
- ISCC–NBS descriptor: Brilliant greenish yellow
- B: Normalized to [0–255] (byte)

Displayed at right is the color greenish yellow. It is the main color on the Indian 20-rupee note.

=== Jonquil ===
Jonquil
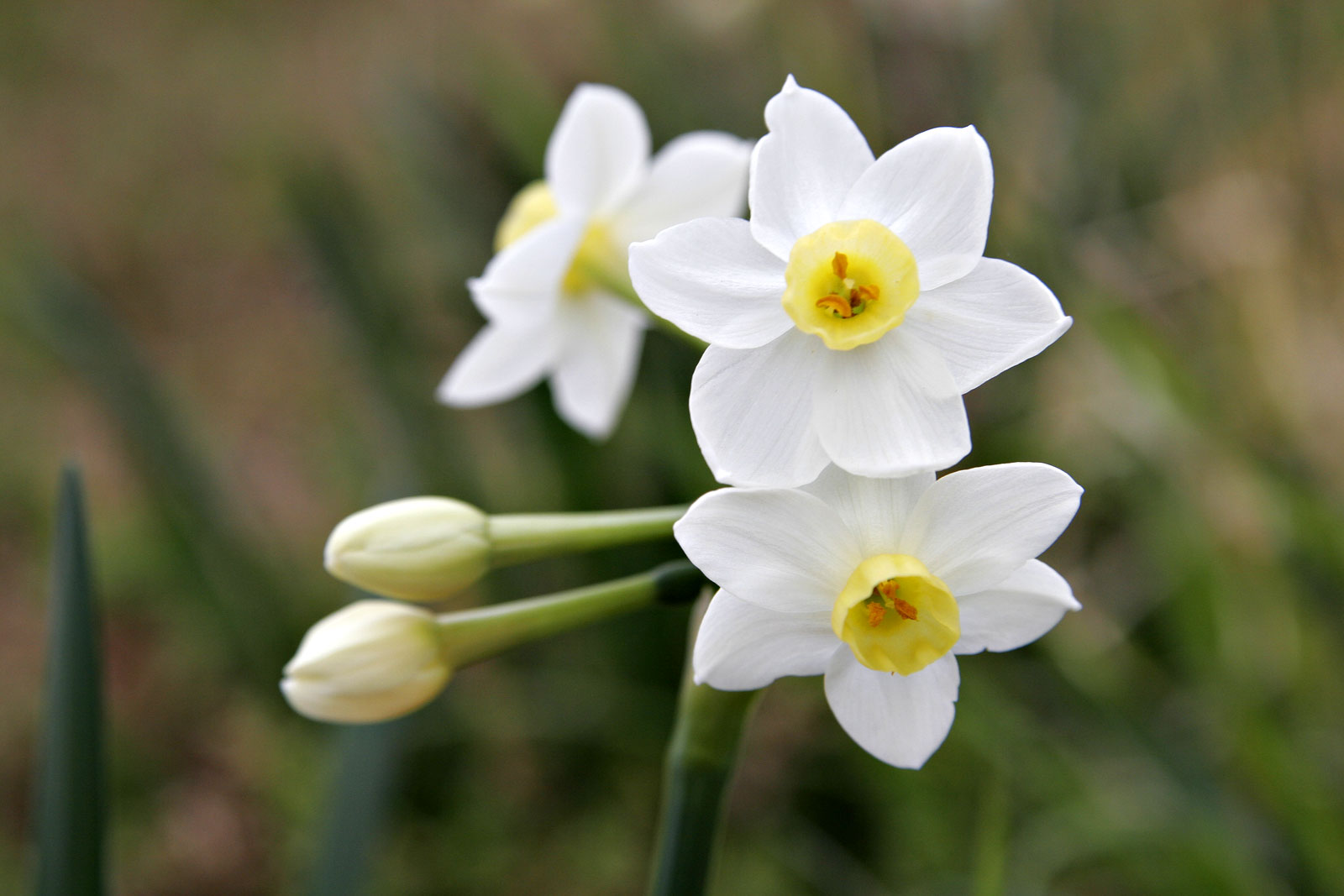

Color coordinates
- Hex triplet: #F4CA16
- sRGB^{B} (r, g, b): (244, 202, 22)
- HSV (h, s, v): (49°, 91%, 96%)
- CIELCh_{uv} (L, C, h): (83, 93, 67°)
- Source: Maerz and Paul
- ISCC–NBS descriptor: Vivid yellow
- B: Normalized to [0–255] (byte)

Jonquil is a hue of yellow. It is the color of the interior of the central cylindrical tubular projection of the jonquil flower. The color takes its name from a species of plant, Narcissus jonquilla, which has clusters of small fragrant yellow flowers, and is native to the Mediterranean.

=== Lemon ===
Lemon (Crayola)
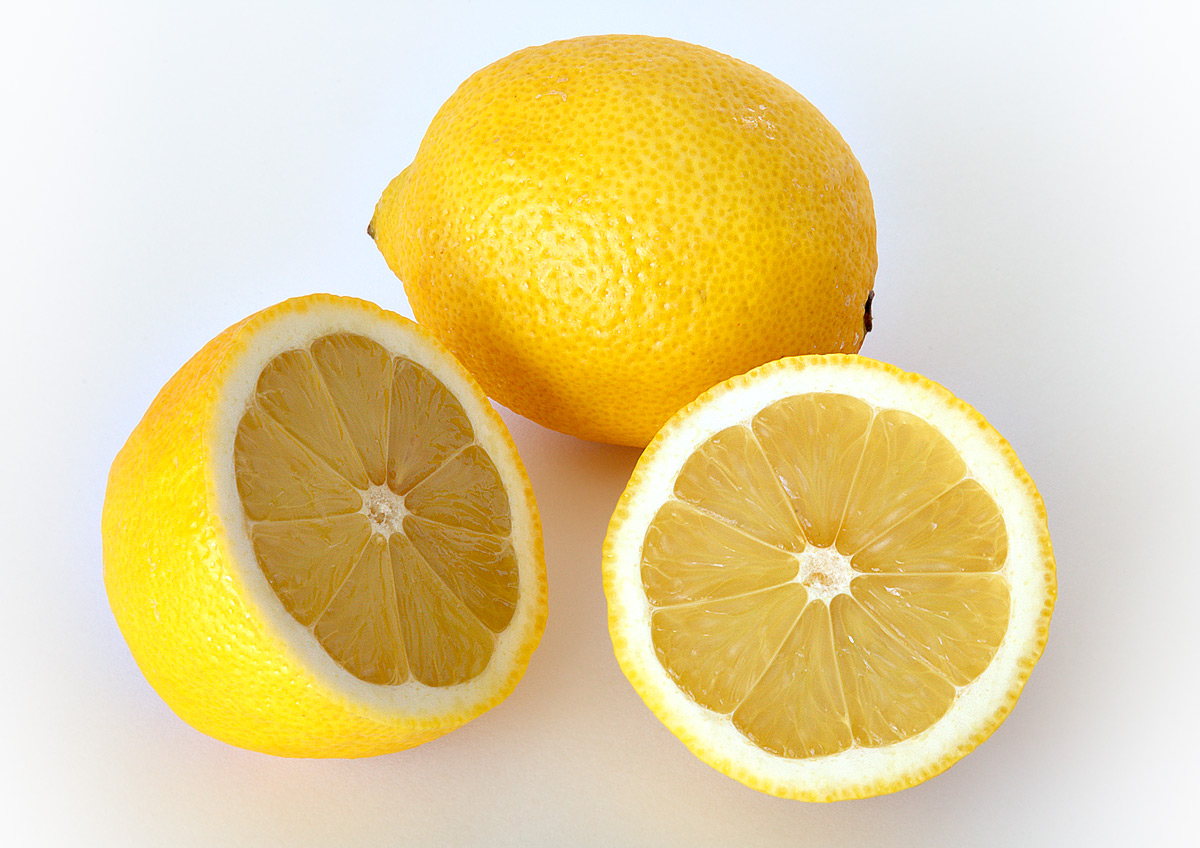

Color coordinates
- Hex triplet: #FDFF00
- sRGB^{B} (r, g, b): (253, 255, 0)
- HSV (h, s, v): (60°, 100%, 100%)
- CIELCh_{uv} (L, C, h): (97, 107, 87°)
- Source: Crayola
- ISCC–NBS descriptor: Vivid greenish yellow
- B: Normalized to [0–255] (byte)

Lemon is a color somewhat resembling yellow and named after the fruit. The color lemon is a representation of the color of the outer skin of a lemon.

The first recorded use of lemon as a color name in English was in 1598.

=== Mango ===
Mango
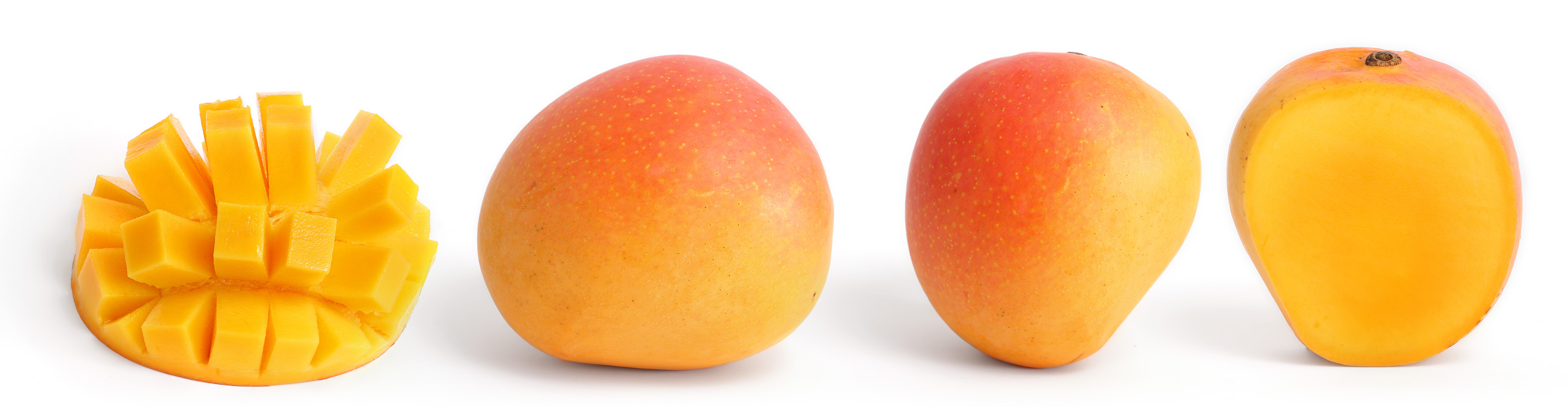

Color coordinates
- Hex triplet: #FFC800
- sRGB^{B} (r, g, b): (255, 200, 0)
- HSV (h, s, v): (47°, 100%, 100%)
- CIELCh_{uv} (L, C, h): (83, 98, 62°)
- Source: Crayola C.P.
- ISCC–NBS descriptor: Vivid yellow-orange
- B: Normalized to [0–255] (byte)

A yellow-orange color that resembles mangoes. It is named after the fruit. It is currently unknown when mango was first used as a color name in English.

=== Mellow yellow ===
Mellow yellow

Color coordinates
- Hex triplet: #F8DE7E
- sRGB^{B} (r, g, b): (248, 222, 126)
- HSV (h, s, v): (47°, 49%, 97%)
- CIELCh_{uv} (L, C, h): (89, 68, 71°)
- Source: Plochere
- ISCC–NBS descriptor: Light yellow
- B: Normalized to [0–255] (byte)

The color mellow yellow is displayed at right.

Mellow yellow was first used as a color name in English in 1948 when it was formulated as one of the colors on the Plochere color list.

The source of this color is the Plochere Color System, a color system formulated in 1948 that is widely used by interior designers.

Donovan's album Mellow Yellow, named after the song "Mellow Yellow", was popular during the Summer of Love in 1967.

=== Moccasin ===
Moccasin
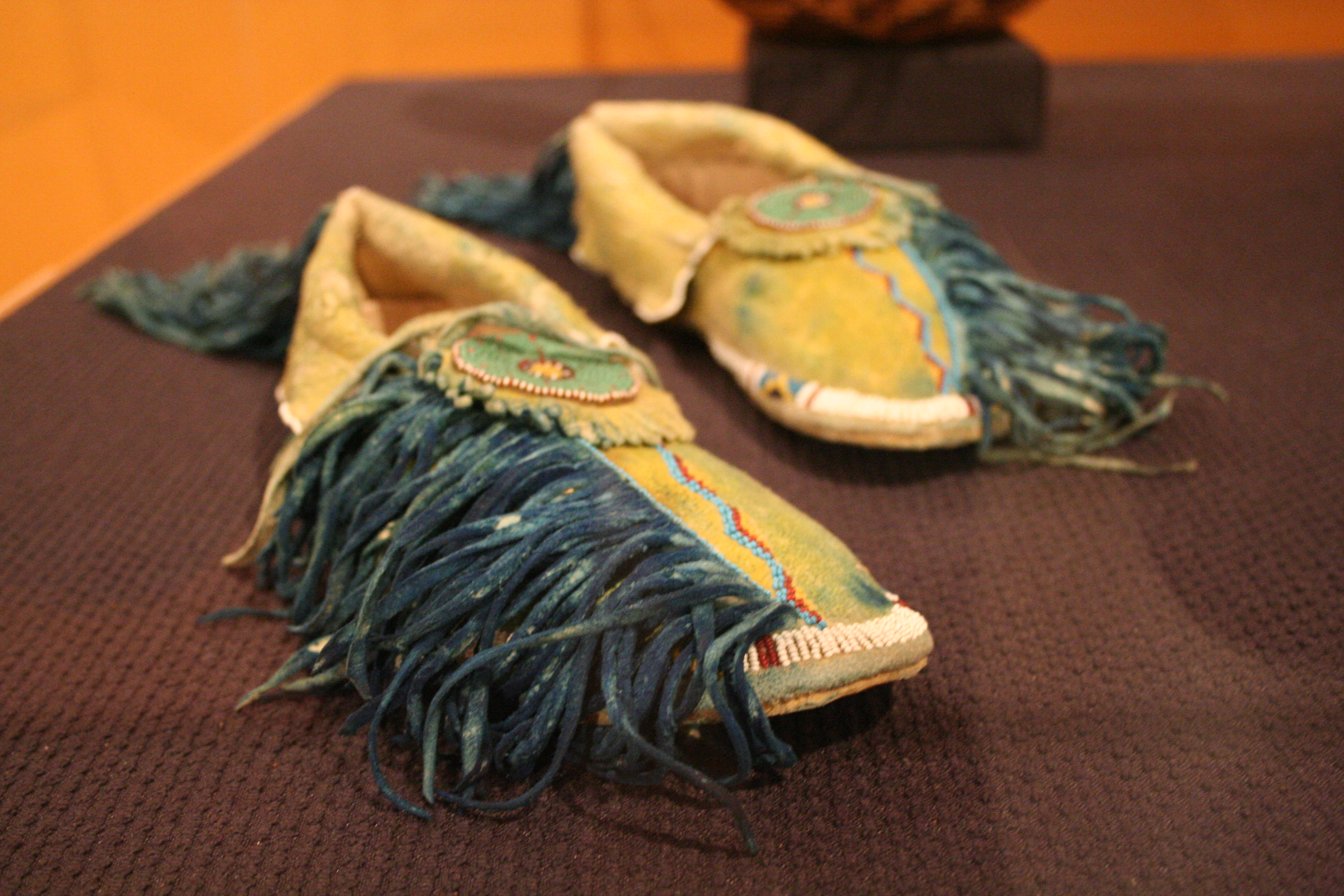

Color coordinates
- Hex triplet: #FFE4B5
- sRGB^{B} (r, g, b): (255, 228, 181)
- HSV (h, s, v): (38°, 29%, 100%)
- CIELCh_{uv} (L, C, h): (92, 42, 62°)
- Source: X11
- B: Normalized to [0–255] (byte)

A brownish yellow, common of the leather shoe with the same name.

=== Orpiment ===
Orpiment
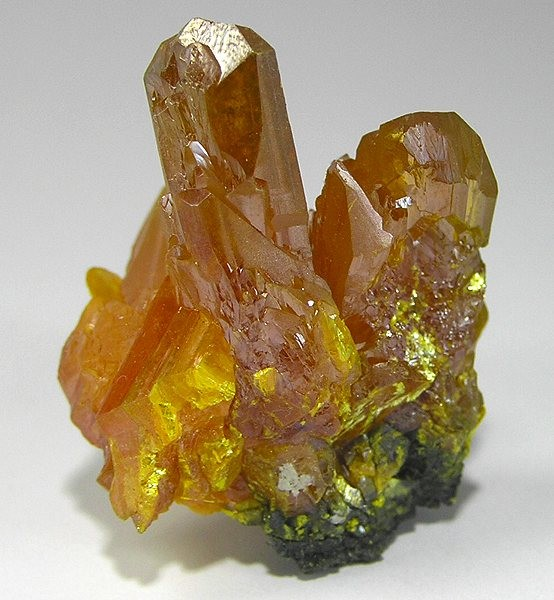
- Orpiment crystal from Twin Creeks Mine, Potosi District, Humboldt County, Nevada

Color coordinates
- Hex triplet: #FDCC01
- sRGB^{B} (r, g, b): (253, 204, 1)
- HSV (h, s, v): (48°, 100%, 99%)
- CIELCh_{uv} (L, C, h): (84, 98, 64°)
- Source: X11
- ISCC–NBS descriptor: Vivid yellow green
- B: Normalized to [0–255] (byte)

Orpiment, also known as ″yellow arsenic blende″, is a deep-colored, orange-yellow arsenic sulfide mineral with formula As_{2}S_{3}. It is found in volcanic fumaroles, low-temperature hydrothermal veins, and hot springs and may be formed through sublimation.

Orpiment takes its name from the Latin auripigmentum (aurum, "gold" + pigmentum, "pigment"), due to its deep-yellow color. Orpiment once was widely used in artworks, medicine, and other applications.

=== Pear ===
Pear
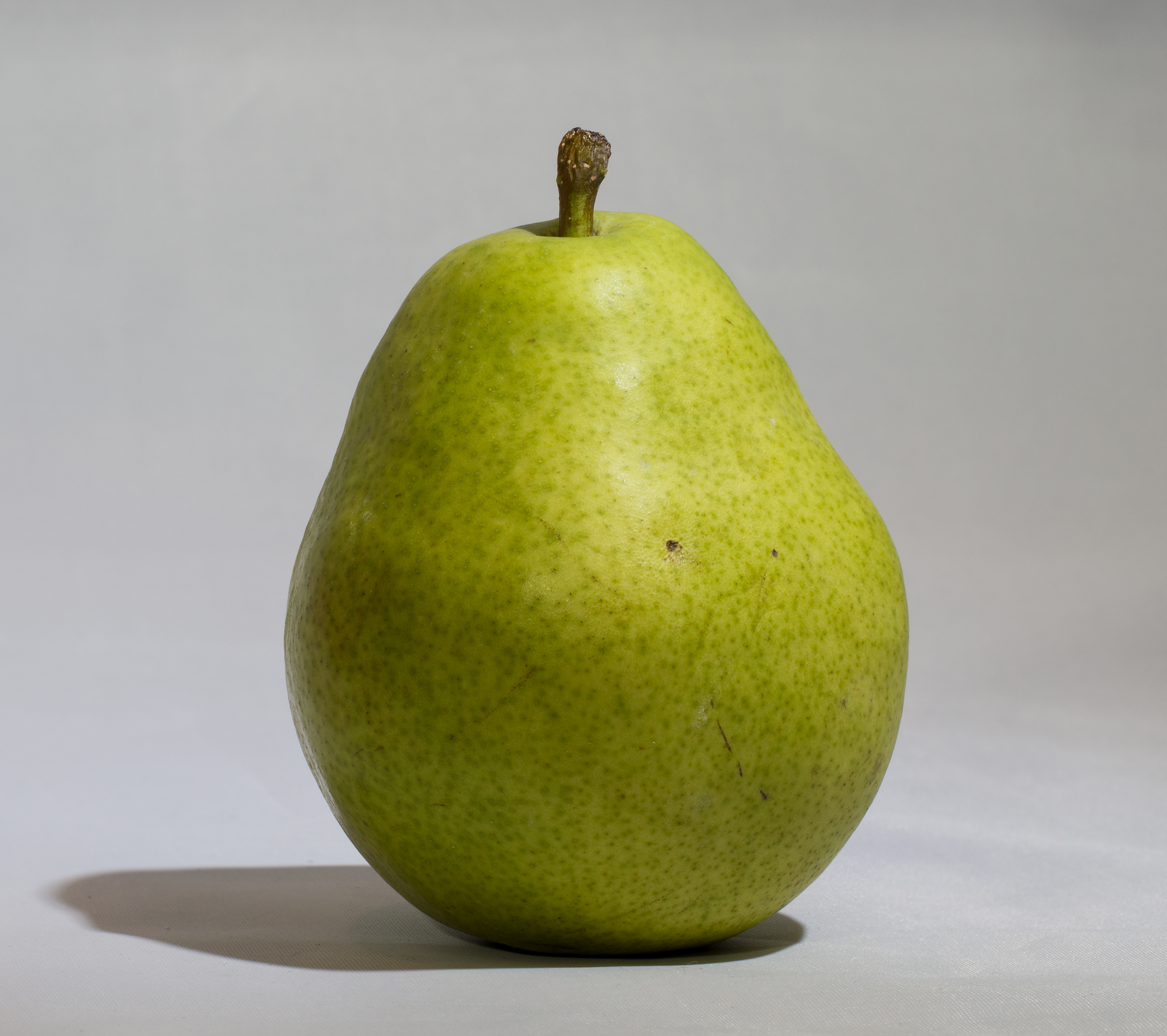
- Anjou pear

Color coordinates
- Hex triplet: #DFFF00
- sRGB^{B} (r, g, b): (223, 255, 0)
- HSV (h, s, v): (68°, 100%, 100%)
- CIELCh_{uv} (L, C, h): (95, 108, 97°)
- Source: Secondary color
- ISCC–NBS descriptor: Vivid yellow green
- B: Normalized to [0–255] (byte)

Pear is a desaturated chartreuse yellow color that resembles the color of the exterior surface of Anjou or Bartlett pears.

=== Royal yellow ===
Royal yellow
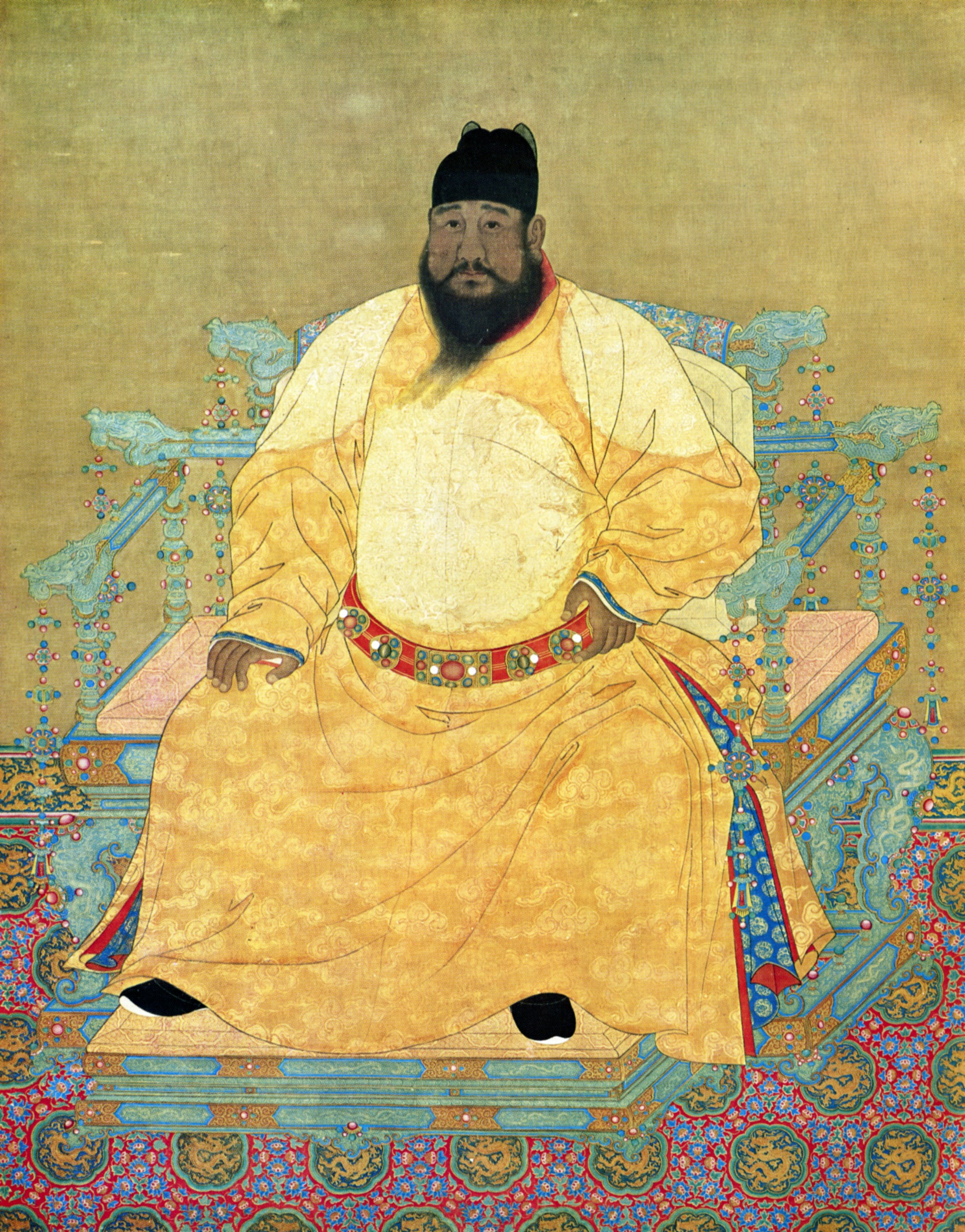
- The Xuande Emperor of the Chinese Ming dynasty—reigned 1425 to 1435

Color coordinates
- Hex triplet: #FADA5E
- sRGB^{B} (r, g, b): (250, 218, 94)
- HSV (h, s, v): (48°, 62%, 98%)
- CIELCh_{uv} (L, C, h): (88, 81, 70°)
- Source: ISCC-NBS
- ISCC–NBS descriptor: Brilliant yellow
- B: Normalized to [0–255] (byte)

At right is displayed the color royal yellow or Stil de grain yellow.

The color royal yellow is a representation of the color of the robes worn by the Emperor of China.

The first recorded use of royal yellow as a color name in English was in 1548. Other names for this color are Chinese yellow and imperial yellow.

=== Safety yellow ===
Safety yellow
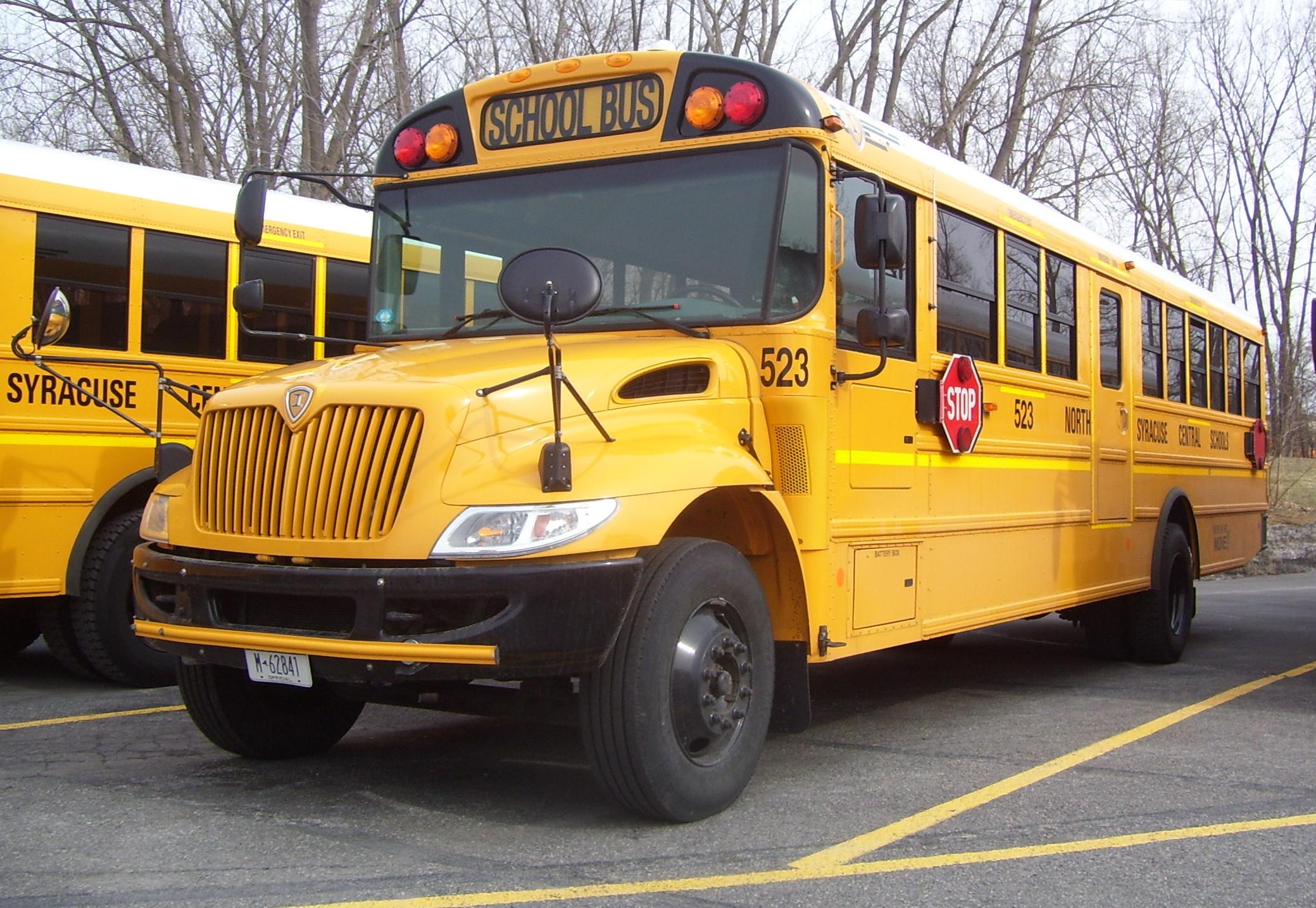
- A yellow school bus

Color coordinates
- Hex triplet: #EED202
- sRGB^{B} (r, g, b): (238, 210, 2)
- HSV (h, s, v): (53°, 99%, 93%)
- CIELCh_{uv} (L, C, h): (84, 94, 74°)
- Source: ANSI Z535
- ISCC–NBS descriptor: Vivid yellow
- B: Normalized to [0–255] (byte)

Safety yellow is one of the standard high-visibility safety colors defined by ANSI standard Z535, which specifies standards for safety and accident prevention information. It is often used on hazard symbols, warning signs, guard rails, dangerous equipment, older American civil defense sirens (typically from the 1950s and 1960s), and some high-visibility clothing and personal protective equipment. The definition is mirrored in British Standard BS 381C and Australian Standard AS2700 (where it is known as golden yellow). In 1937, it was determined that safety yellow was the best color to be noticed by the human brain; as a result, the paint color of all United States school buses was changed from orange to safety yellow (see also school bus yellow).

=== Tartrazine ===
Tartrazine

Color coordinates
- Hex triplet: #F7D917
- sRGB^{B} (r, g, b): (247, 217, 23)
- HSV (h, s, v): (52°, 91%, 97%)
- CIELCh_{uv} (L, C, h): (87, 96, 73°)
- Source: iColorpalette
- ISCC–NBS descriptor: Vibrant yellow
- B: Normalized to [0–255] (byte)

The color tartrazine is a vibrant, warm-toned shade of warm yellow.

=== Xander ===
Xander

Color coordinates
- Hex triplet: #44500C
- sRGB^{B} (r, g, b): (68, 80, 12)
- HSV (h, s, v): (71°, 85%, 31%)
- CIELCh_{uv} (L, C, h): (32, 34, 98°)
- Source: The Official Register of Color Names
- ISCC–NBS descriptor: Moderate olive green
- B: Normalized to [0–255] (byte)

Xander is a dark yellow color that resembles the color olive.

=== Xanthic ===
Xanthic

Color coordinates
- Hex triplet: #EEED09
- sRGB^{B} (r, g, b): (238, 237, 9)
- HSV (h, s, v): (60°, 96%, 93%)
- CIELCh_{uv} (L, C, h): (91, 100, 85°)
- Source: The Official Register of Color Names
- ISCC–NBS descriptor: Vivid greenish yellow
- B: Normalized to [0–255] (byte)

The name of the color xanthic is derived from xantho (meaning yellow or golden), from the Ancient Greek ξανθός and "ic" (meaning of or pertaining to), from the Latin adjectival suffix -icus.

The color "xanthic" is the color of Xanthine and Xanthate, both of which are xanthic acids.

== See also ==
- Lists of colors
