= Hans Diedrich Henatsch =

German neuroscientist

- Born: Germany
- Education: University of Göttingen
- Scientific career
- Fields: Medicine and Systems Physiology

Hans Diedrich Henatsch served as the Head of the Department of Neurophysiology of the Medical School of the University of Göttingen from the early sixties to the mid nineties.

He was a long-standing friend and colleague of Ragnar Granit and John Eccles. He became known in the sixties for recordings from spinal cord cells in anesthetized cats and his research in spinal cord physiology and spasticity.

On June 5 (Henatsch's birthday) 1997, after his death, Prof. Diethelm Richter (Henatsch's successor) organized a little memorial in the institute, on which occasion Eike Schomburg gave the laudatio.

== Influential publications ==
- Granit, R. and Henatsch, H. D. (1956). "Gamma control of dynamic properties of muscle spindles", J. Neurophysiol. 19, 356-366.
- Granit, R., Henatsch, H.-D. and Steg, G. (1956), Tonic and Phasic Ventral Horn Cells Differentiated by Post-Tetanic Potentiation in Cat Extensors. Acta Physiologica Scandinavica, 37: 114–126. doi:10.1111/j.1748-1716.1956.tb01347.x
- Henatsch, H. -D. and Ingvar, D. H. (1956). Chlorpromazin und Spastizität. European Archives of Psychiatry and clinical neuroscience, 195:77-93, doi:10.1007/BF00342008
