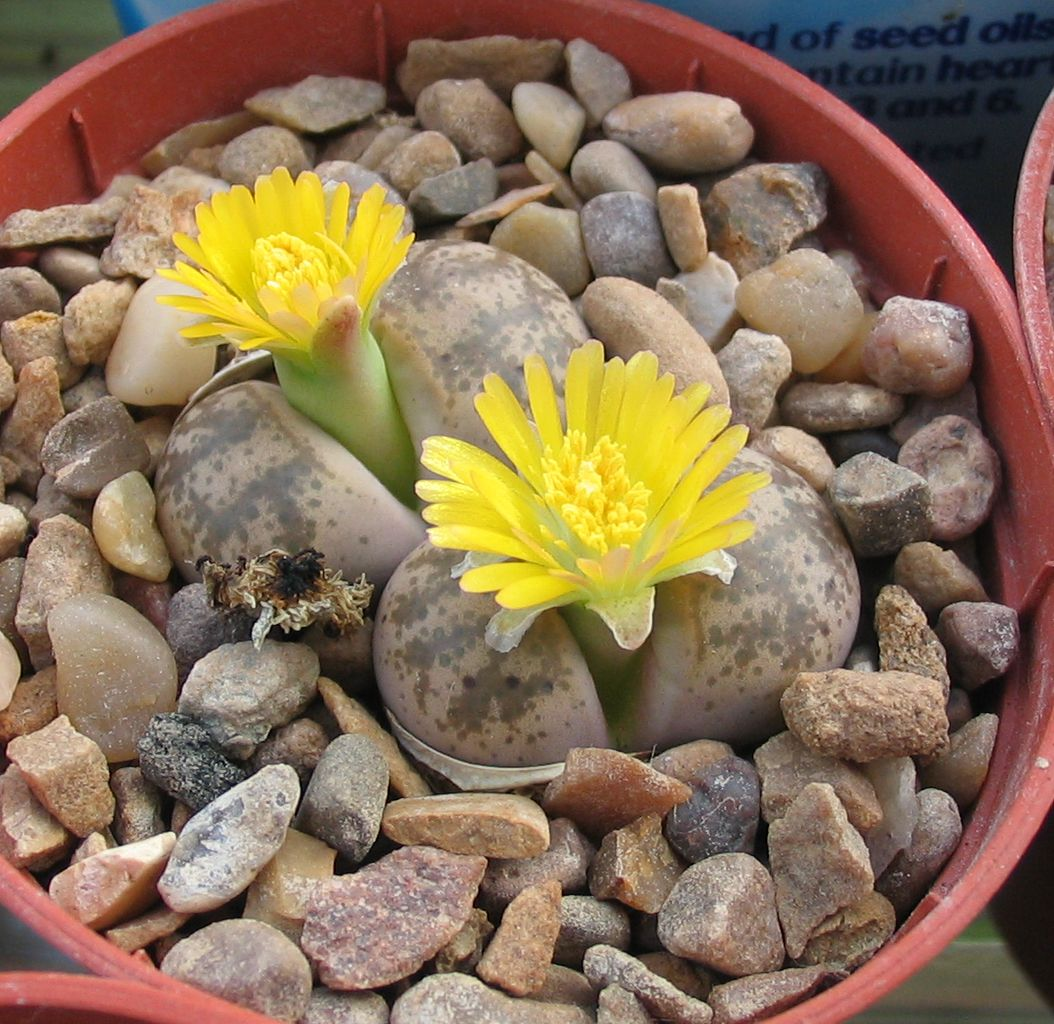
- Lithops coleorum in cultivation

Scientific classification
- Kingdom: Plantae
- Clade: Embryophytes
- Clade: Tracheophytes
- Clade: Spermatophytes
- Clade: Angiosperms
- Clade: Eudicots
- Order: Caryophyllales
- Family: Aizoaceae
- Genus: Lithops
- Species: L. coleorum

Binomial name
- Lithops coleorum S.A. Hammer & Uijs (1994)

= Lithops coleorum =

Species of succulent

Lithops coleorum is a small flowering succulent plant of the family Aizoaceae. It is native to Limpopo Province of South Africa.

It is named for the botanical collectors Desmond Thorne Cole and his wife Naureen Adele Cole.

== Appearance ==
Light yellow epidermis combined with a brownish pattern resembling halftone print.

When blooming, it produces yellow flowers.
