= Unique hues =

Hues not describable as mixtures of other hues

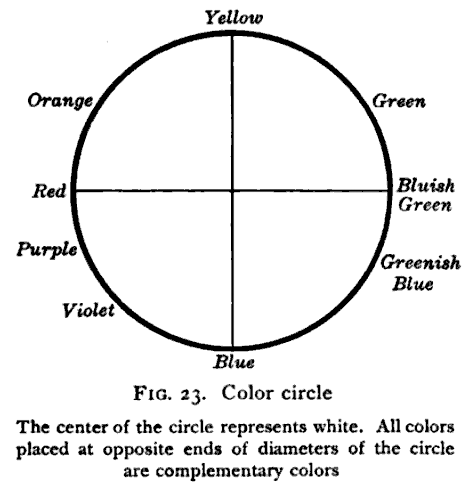
A concept of four unique hues of psychologist Charles Hubbard Judd (1917)

Unique hue is a term used in perceptual psychology of color vision and generally applied to the purest hues of blue, green, yellow and red. The proponents of the opponent process theory believe that these hues cannot be described as a mixture of other hues, and are therefore pure, whereas all other hues are composite. The neural correlate of the unique hues are approximated by the extremes of the opponent channels in opponent process theory. In this context, unique hues are sometimes described as "psychological primaries" as they can be considered analogous to the primary colors of trichromatic color theory.

== Opponent process theory ==
Approximations within the sRGB gamut to the "aim colors" of the Natural Color System, a model based on the opponent process theory of color vision.

The concept of certain hues as 'unique' came with the introduction of opponent process theory, which Ewald Hering introduced in 1878. Hering first proposed the idea that red, green, blue, and yellow were unique hues ("Urfarben"), based on the concept that these colors could not be simultaneously perceived. These hues represented the extremes of two perpendicular axes of color: a red-green axis and a blue-yellow axis. While this theory with 4 unique hues was initially considered contradictory to the Young-Helmholtz trichromatic theory's three primary colors, the two theories were reconciled theoretically by Erwin Schrödinger and the later discovery of color-opponent cells in the retina and lateral geniculate nucleus (LGN) related the two theories physiologically.

== Physiology ==
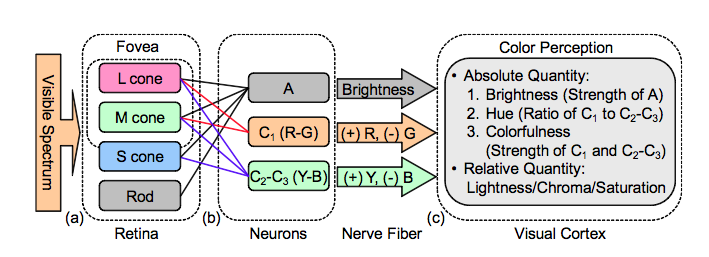
Diagram of the opponent process

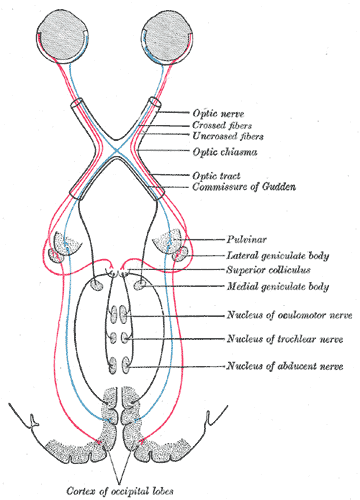
Signal path from the eyes to the LGN.

A physiological pathway from the cones in the retina to a neural correlate for the psychological unique hues has been elusive. Mollon and Jordan stated in 1997: "...the nature of the unique hues remains mysterious and we do not know whether they tell us anything about the neural organisation of the visual system." The first transformation of light to a neuronal signal (visual phototransduction) yields 3 channels, each proportional to the quantal catch of one cone type (L-, M- and S-), estimated by the LMS color space. The second transformation occurs in the color-opponent cells and produces the opponent process channels: L+M (luminance), L-M (red-green), and S-(L+M) (blue-yellow), the latter of which form the cardinal axes.

Hering and researchers until the mid 20th century expected that the cardinal axes would correspond to the unique hues, i.e. the unique hues would exist when one opponent channel is maximally stimulated and the other opponent channel is in equilibrium. However, subsequent psychophysical tests demonstrated that while unique red lies on the extreme of the L-M axis, the other unique hues do not lie on the extremes of either opponent channel (L-M and S-(L+M) axes). Therefore, the cardinal axes are not a direct correlate of our experience of unique hues and a further (third) transformation must be applied to identify correlates, i.e. each unique hue is a synthesis of the opponent process channels. One theory suggests a conversion at a point later than the LGN, and that this produces non-linear combinations resulting in our experience of color being non-linear to the cardinal axes. However, while opponent-cells have been found in the LGN that respond to cone combinations other than those of the cardinal axes, such as M-S, there is no physiological understanding of this third transformation. An opposing theory therefore suggests that hues are learned based on variations in the visual environment; that unique hues represent an adaptation away from the cardinal axes and unique hues cannot be explained by relative numbers of excited L- and M-cones or their sensitivities.

There is mixed evidence as to whether unique hues are perceptually privileged compared to other colors. Some research suggests that there is no greater sensitivity for unique hues compared to other colors, but other evidence suggests there is greater sensitivity for yellows and blues, which may be due to them coinciding with the daylight locus. There is no direct evidence that larger populations of neurons are dedicated to unique hues compared to other colors, but some EEG research suggests that the latency of some EEG components may be shorter for unique hues compared to non-unique hues, and that colors can be decoded with a higher accuracy from EEG signals when they are unique hues.

== Measurement ==
Unique hues are typically quantified as wavelength of monochromatic light, Munsell color, or hue degree derived from a RGB color space. The subject is asked to determine the hue that is not contaminated by neighboring unique hues, either by the method of adjustment, where the subject freely adjusts the color until they reach the unique hue, or two-alternative forced choice (2AFC) staircases. In the latter, the subject iteratively chooses which of two spectral color options is more pure. The unchosen color is replaced with a color on the opposite side of the chosen color. When the same color is chosen twice in a row, this constitutes a reversal, and the step size decreases. After a certain number of reversals, the wavelength/hue of the unique hue is determined.

== Variability ==
The unique hues have been experimentally determined to represent average hue angles of 353° (carmine-red), 128° (cobalt green), 228° (cobalt blue), 58° (yellow). However, the values have large inter-subject and slight intra-subject variability, depending on the state of adaptation of the visual system. For example, the wavelength attributed to unique green varies by up to 70 nm between subjects. The variance greatly exceeds the variance that would be expected from differing L:M cone ratios or spectral sensitivities, but the source of this variance has not been identified.

Unique hues are a useful tool in measuring intra-subject variability in color perception. Neitz et al (2002) show that unique yellow shifts towards longer wavelengths following multi-day adaptation to red environments, and is also shifted for deuteranomalous colorblind observers. The researchers interpret these results as suggesting a long-term normalisation mechanism which can change the weighting of cone inputs to compensate for global changes in illumination, allowing color vision to remain optimal in a changing chromatic environment. Unique hues have also been shown to change over the course of the year as a result of adaptation to differences in the color spectrum of the environment in summer compared to winter, and have been shown to change after surgery to remove cataracts.

Unique hues have played an important role in understanding linguistic relativity or the idea that language has a significant influence on thought. The way in which language and culture affects color naming is debated and not yet fully understood. The Universalist side of the debate argues that unique color terms are biologically tied to the human visual system and the visual environment and are the same regardless of language and culture. The Relativist side argues that language contextualizes thought and therefore perception, the idea being that having a different environment and culture causes the perception of the individual to be different.

=== In color vision deficiency ===
Unique hues have different meaning in subjects with color vision deficiency. Unique yellow was determined to skew to higher wavelengths for anomalous trichromats (deuteranomaly), approaching 700 nm for strong deutans. Dichromats, who possess a single chromatic opponent channel, thereby have unique hues at the extremes of their visible spectrum, where each cone is excited independently, which renders unique hues an ineffective tool for quantifying dichromatic color vision. However, it is common to use similar techniques for defining the wavelength corresponding to "unique white" (achromatic point) of dichromats as means for quantifying their color vision. While imbalance in the L:M cone ratio is linked to mild red-green color vision deficiency, there is no dependence of unique yellow on the L:M ratio. Likewise, there is no change to unique yellow for carriers of dichromacy.

== See also ==
- CIECAM02 § Appearance correlates
- Color wheel
- Complementary colors
- Natural Color System
- Psychophysics
