= Gunnar Svaetichin =

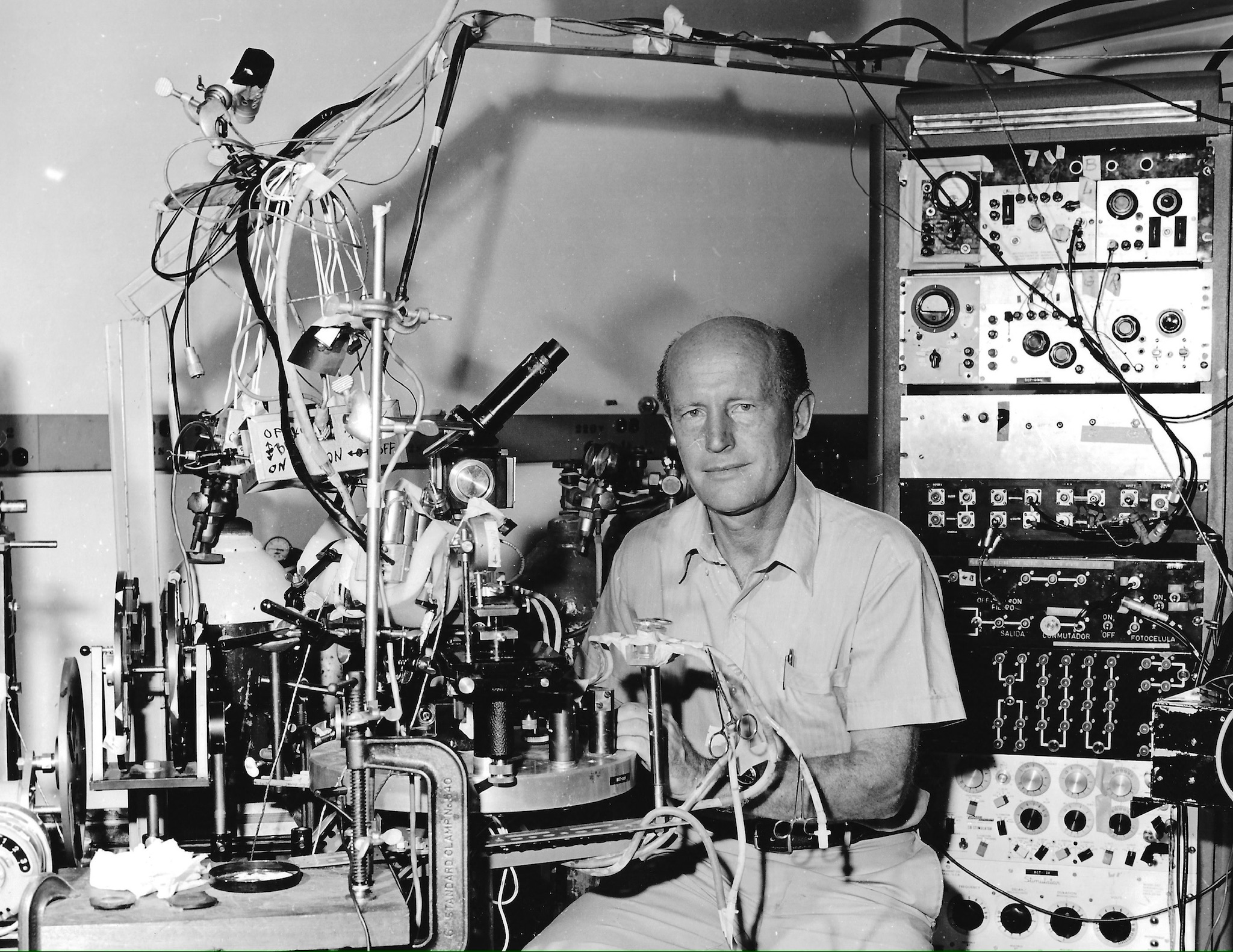
- Gunnar Svaetichin in his laboratory
- Born: Gunnar Nils Toivo Svaetichin; 13 January 1915; Karis, Finland
- Died: 23 March 1981 (aged 66); Caracas, Venezuela
- Known for: Discovery of S-potentials

Gunnar Nils Toivo Svaetichin (13 January 1915 – 23 March 1981) was a Swedish-Finnish-Venezuelan physiologist who, in 1956, showed by examining the external layers of fish retinas that electroretinograms display particular sensitivity to three different groups of wavelengths in the areas of blue, green and red. This provided the first biological demonstration in support of the Young-Helmholtz trichromatic theory. He also gave name to the S-potential, which was the first experimental evidence that opponency existed in the visual system.

Born in Finland, he moved to Sweden in 1948, and from 1955 until his death, he worked as a researcher in Venezuela.

== Early life and family ==
He was born in 1915 in Karis, Finland, the son of the engineering surveyor Volmar Svaetichin and his wife Ellen (born Nordstrom).

== Education ==
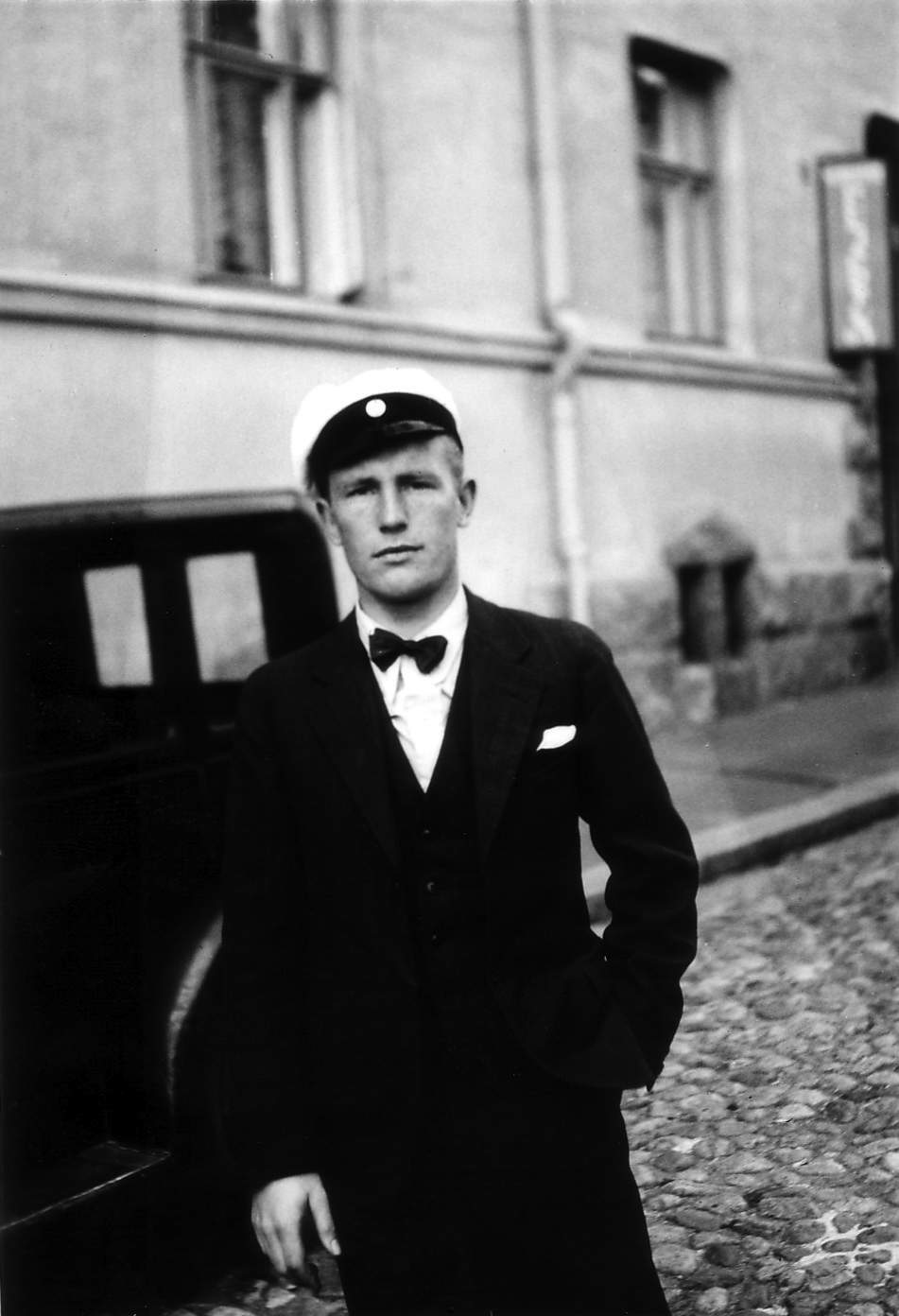
Young Svaetichin in his student cap

After attending schools in Karis and Helsinki, he went on to graduate from medical school at the University of Helsinki, where he also worked as a researcher. During his medical studies in Helsinki, Svaetichin got to know the young Ragnar Granit, who had returned after some years in the US and Oxford and become a professor of physiology. His first work as a doctor was when the Finnish Winter War broke out and Svaetichin was drafted and sent to a first aid station located just behind the front lines.

== Research work ==
In cooperation with Ragnar Granit, Svaetichin developed a new methodology for the electrophysiological study of vision. They made micropipettes that could register signals from the neuronal pathway projecting from the retina via the optic nerve and into the brain. It was with this technique that Ragnar Granit could perform the studies of color vision, which subsequently earned him the Nobel Prize in 1967.

In 1956, Svaetichin was able to make a breakthrough and discovered that certain retinal neurons hyperpolarize instead of depolarize from light stimulation. Until now, scientists had thought that neurons could only be depolarized by synaptic input (Perlman, Kolb, Nelson, 2011). Initially, Svaetichin thought that he was looking at single cones, but gradually realized that the signals (S-Potentials) came from a second order layer of neurons postsynaptic to the photo receptors (cones). This helped explain opponency and laid the foundation for the field of retinal interneuron research. Over time these neurons came to be named horizontal cells, which have come to be foundational for our understanding of vision and for the development of the theory behind neural networks and artificial intelligence (AI).

“The discovery of neural color opponency ranks with the most significant findings in color vision in the 20th century” (p292, Gouras, 1982). Together with MacNichol, Svaetichin named these opponent cells yellow-blue and red-green opponent color cells with on-center and off-surround for these specific color pairings. Opponency can be seen as the first layer of information processing in the neural networks that enable vision.

Svaetichin’s maybe greatest contribution to visual neuroscience was by showing that retinal neurons show specific sensitivity to three different clusters of wavelengths in the areas of red, green and blue. This provided the first biological demonstration of Young-Helmholz trichromatic theory proposed by Thomas Young in 1802.

In the later years of his life Svaetichin directed a laboratory at the Venezuelan Institute of Neurology and Brain Research.
