= Opponent process =

Theory regarding color vision in humans

The opponent process is a hypothesis of color vision that states that the human visual system interprets information about color by processing signals from the three types of photoreceptor cells in an antagonistic manner. The three types of cones are called L, M, and S. The names stand for "Long wavelength sensitive,” "middle wavelength sensitive," and "short wavelength sensitive." The opponent-process theory implicates three opponent channels: L versus M, S versus (L+M), and a luminance channel (+ versus -). These cone-opponent mechanisms were at one time thought to be the neural substrate for a psychological theory called Hering's Opponent Colors Theory, which calls for three psychologically important opponent color processes: red versus green, blue versus yellow, and black versus white (luminance). The Opponent Colors Theory is named for the German physiologist Ewald Hering who proposed the idea in the late 19th century. However, it has been argued that Hering’s Opponent Colors Theory lacks adequate phenomenological and empirical support, and may not be a necessary feature of normal human color experience. Correspondingly, considerable physiological and behavioral evidence proves that the physiological cone opponent mechanisms do not constitute the neurobiological basis for Hering's Opponent Colors Theory.

== Color theory ==
=== Complementary colors ===
When staring at a bright color for a while (e.g. red), then looking away at a white field, an afterimage is perceived, such that the original color will evoke its complementary color (cyan, in the case of red input). When complementary colors are combined or mixed, they "cancel each other out" and become neutral (white or gray). That is, complementary colors are never perceived as a mixture; there is no "greenish red" or "yellowish blue", despite claims to the contrary. The strongest color contrast that a color can have is its complementary color. Complementary colors may also be called "opposite colors" and they were originally considered the primary evidence in support of Hering's Opponent Colors Theory. There are two fatal problems with this evidence. First, the complement of red is not green, as called for by Hering's theory; it is bluish-green. And second, there exists a complementary color for every color, so there is nothing special about the set of complementary pairs picked out by Hering's theory.

=== Unique hues ===
Opponent color pairs based on the NCS experiment, including black, white and the four unique hues

The colors that define the extremes for each opponent channel are called unique hues, as opposed to composite (mixed) hues. Ewald Hering first defined the unique hues as red, green, blue, and yellow, and based them on the concept that these colors could not be simultaneously perceived. For example, a color cannot appear both red and green. These definitions have been experimentally refined and are represented today by average hue angles of 353° (carmine red), 128° (cobalt green), 228° (cobalt blue), 58° (yellow).

The unique hues are a defining feature of many psychological color spaces, but there is substantial evidence showing that the unique hues are not hard wired in the nervous system, contrary to the stipulations of Hering's Opponent Colors Theory. Unique hues can differ between individuals and are often used in psychophysical research to measure variations in color perception due to color-vision deficiencies or color adaptation. While there is considerable inter-subject variability when defining unique hues experimentally, an individual's unique hues are very consistent, to within a few nanometers of wavelength.

== Physiological basis ==
=== Relation to LMS color space ===
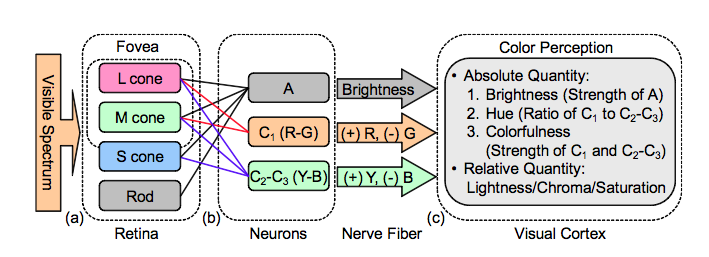
Diagram of the opponent process

The trichromatic theory is in conflict with Hering's Opponent Colors Theory, although it is compatible with a physiological opponent process that compares the outputs of the different classes of cone types. The poles of these cone opponent mechanisms do not correspond to the unique hues of Hering's Opponent Colors Theory and unlike the unique hues, have no privilege in color perception.

Most humans have three different cone cells in their retinas that facilitate trichromatic color vision. Colors are determined by the proportional excitation of these three cone types, i.e. their quantum catch. The levels of excitation of each cone type are the parameters that define LMS color space. To calculate the opponent process tristimulus values from the LMS color space, the cone excitations must be compared:

- The luminous (achromatic) opponent channel is a weighted sum of all three cone cells (plus the rod cells in some conditions).
- The red–green opponent channel is equal to the difference of the L- and M-cones.
- The blue–yellow opponent channel is equal to the difference of the S-cone and the average/weighted sum of the L- and M-cones.

Most mammals have no L cone (the primate L cone arose from a gene duplication of the M cone opsin gene). These mammals still show two kinds of opponent channels in their retinal ganglion cells: the achromatic channel and the blue-yellow opponency channel.

=== Cone opponent mechanisms are encoded in the retina ===
Spatial contrast sensitivity functions for luminance and chromatic contrast.

The output of different types of cones are compared by cells in the retina including retina bipolar cells (which compare signals from L and M cones) and bistratified retinal ganglion cells (which compare S cone signals with L and M cone signals). The output of bipolar cells is relayed to the visual cortex by the retinal ganglion cells (RGCs) by way of a thalamic relay station called the lateral geniculate nucleus (LGN) of the thalamus. Much of the scientific knowledge of retinal ganglion cell physiology was obtained by neural recordings of cells in the LGN.

The cone-opponent mechanisms in the retina and LGN represent a fundamental physiological opponent process but do not represent the unique hues (or Hering's Opponent Colors Theory). For example, the colors that best elicit responses of the bistratified S-(L+M)-opponent neurons are best described as purplish (or lavender) and lime-green, not "blue" and "yellow". The neurons are sometimes referred to as "blue–yellow" neurons, but this is a historical artifact dating to the time when it was thought that Hering's Opponent Colors Theory was hardwired by the retina and the mismatch between the colors to which they are optimally tuned and Hering's Opponent Colors was overlooked. Cone opponent mechanisms exist in the retinas of many mammals, including monkeys, mice, and cats. In primates, the LGN contains three major classes of layers:

- Magnocellular layers (M, large-cell) – responsible largely for the luminance channel
- Parvocellular layers (P, small-cell) – responsible largely for red–green opponency
- Koniocellular layers (K) – responsible largely for blue–yellow opponency, poor spatial resolution, long latency

Other mammals such as cats also have three cell types denoted as X (magno), Y (parvo), and W (konio). The W type is beyond most doubt homologous to the primate K type. There are some subtle differences between the M and X types as well as the Y and P types to make the correspondence unclear.

=== Advantage ===
Transmitting information in opponent-channel color space could be advantageous over transmitting it in LMS color space ("raw" signals from each cone type). There is some overlap in the wavelengths of light to which the three types of cones (L for long-wave, M for medium-wave, and S for short-wave light) respond, so it is more efficient for the visual system (from a perspective of dynamic range) to record differences between the responses of cones, rather than each type of cone's individual response.

Hurvich and Jameson argued that the use of opponent-channel color space would increase color contrast, making the information easier to process by later stages of vision.

=== Color blindness ===
Color blindness can be classified by the cone cell that is affected (protan, deutan, tritan) or by the opponent channel that is affected (red–green or blue–yellow). In either case, the channel can either be inactive (in the case of dichromacy) or have a lower dynamic range (in the case of anomalous trichromacy). For example, individuals with deuteranopia see little difference between the red and green unique hues.

== History ==
Johann Wolfgang von Goethe first studied the physiological effect of opposed colors in his Theory of Colours in 1810. Goethe arranged his color wheel symmetrically "for the colours diametrically opposed to each other in this diagram are those which reciprocally evoke each other in the eye. Thus, yellow demands purple; orange, blue; red, green; and vice versa: Thus again all intermediate gradations reciprocally evoke each other."

Ewald Hering proposed opponent color theory in 1892. He thought that the colors red, yellow, green, and blue are special in that any other color can be described as a mix of them, and that they exist in opposite pairs. That is, either red or green is perceived and never greenish-red: Even though yellow is a mixture of red and green in the RGB color theory, humans do not perceive it as such.

Hering's new theory ran counter to the prevailing Young–Helmholtz theory (trichromatic theory), first proposed by Thomas Young in 1802 and developed by Hermann von Helmholtz in 1850. The two theories seemed irreconcilable until 1925 when Erwin Schrödinger was able to reconcile the two theories and show that they can be complementary.

=== Psychophysical investigations ===
In 1957, Leo Hurvich and Dorothea Jameson claimed to provide a psychophysical validation for Hering's theory. Their method was called hue cancellation. Hue cancellation experiments start with a color (e.g. yellow) and attempt to determine how much of the opponent color (e.g. blue) of one of the starting color's components must be added to reach the neutral point. The problem with the method of Hurvich and Jameson is that it defined the unique hues as the colors used in the cancellation; it did not test whether these colors are unique. So, participants were only ever asked to assess the proportion of the four colors (red, green, blue, yellow) in mixtures; they were never asked whether these four colors are the only possible set of primaries as would be required for a scientifically valid test of Hering's Opponent Colors Theory. Bosten and colleagues showed in 2014 that other colors can be used as primaries.

In 1959, Gunnar Svaetichin and MacNichol recorded from the retinae of fish and reported three distinct types of cells:

- One cell responded with hyperpolarization to all light stimuli regardless of wavelength and was termed a luminosity cell.
- Another cell responded with hyperpolarization at short wavelengths and with depolarization at mid-to-long wavelengths. This was termed a chromaticity cell.
- A third cell – also a chromaticity cell – responded with hyperpolarization at fairly short wavelengths, peaking about 490 nm, and with depolarization at wavelengths longer than about 610 nm.

Svaetichin and MacNichol called the chromaticity cells yellow–blue and red–green opponent color cells, following the assumption of the day that Hering's Opponent Colors Theory was hardwired in the brain.

Similar chromatically or spectrally opposed cells, often incorporating spatial opponency (e.g. red "on" center and green "off" surround), were found in the vertebrate retina and lateral geniculate nucleus (LGN) through the 1950s and 1960s by De Valois et al., Wiesel and Hubel, and others.

Following Gunnar Svaetichin's lead, the cells were widely called opponent color cells: red–green and yellow–blue. Over the next three decades, spectrally opposed cells continued to be reported in primate retinae and LGN. A variety of terms are used in the literature to describe these cells, including chromatically opposed or chromatically opponent, spectrally opposed or spectrally opponent, opponent colour, colour opponent, opponent response, and simply, opponent.

=== In other fields ===
Others have applied the idea of opposing stimulations beyond visual systems, described in the article on opponent-process theory. In 1967, Rod Grigg extended the concept to reflect a wide range of opponent processes in biological systems. In 1970, Solomon and Corbit expanded Hurvich and Jameson's general neurological opponent process model to explain emotion, drug addiction, and work motivation.

== Applications ==
The opponent color theory can be applied to computer vision and implemented as the Gaussian color model and the natural-vision-processing model.

== Criticism and the complementary color cells ==
Much controversy exists over whether opponent-processing theory is the best way to explain color vision. A few experiments have been conducted involving image stabilization (where one experiences border loss) that produced results that suggest participants have seen impossible colors, or color combinations humans should not be able to see under the opponent-processing theory. However, many criticize that this result may just be illusory experiences. Critics and researchers have instead started to turn to explain color vision through references to retinal mechanisms, rather than opponent processing, which happens in the brain's visual cortex.

As single-cell recordings accumulated, it became clear to many physiologists and psychophysicists that opponent colors did not satisfactorily account for single-cell spectrally opposed responses. For instance, Jameson and D’Andrade analyzed opponent-colors theory and found the unique hues did not match the spectrally opposed responses. De Valois himself summed it up: "Although we, like others, were most impressed with finding opponent cells, in accord with Hering's suggestions, when the Zeitgeist at the time was strongly opposed to the notion, the earliest recordings revealed a discrepancy between the Hering–Hurvich–Jameson opponent perceptual channels and the response characteristics of opponent cells in the macaque lateral geniculate nucleus." Valberg recalls that "it became common among neurophysiologists to use colour terms when referring to opponent cells as in the notations red-ON cells, green-OFF cells ... In the debate ... some psychophysicists were happy to see what they believed to be opponency confirmed at an objective, physiological level. Consequently, little hesitation was shown in relating the unique and polar color pairs directly to cone opponency. Despite evidence to the contrary ... textbooks have, up to this day, repeated the misconception of relating unique hue perception directly to peripheral cone opponent processes. The analogy with Hering's hypothesis has been carried even further so as to imply that each color in the opponent pair of unique colors could be identified with either excitation or inhibition of one and the same type of opponent cell." Webster et al. and Wuerger et al. have conclusively re-affirmed that single-cell spectrally opposed responses do not align with unique-hue opponent colors.

More recent experiments show that the relationship between the responses of single "color-opponent" cells and perceptual color opponency is even more complex than supposed. Experiments by Zeki et al., using the Land Color Mondrian, have shown that when normal observers view, for example, a green surface which is part of a multi-colored scene and which reflects more green than red light it looks green and its afterimage is magenta. But when the same green surface reflects more red than green light, it still looks green (because of the operation of color constancy mechanisms) and its afterimage is still perceived as magenta. This is true also of other colors and may be summarized by saying that, just as surfaces retain their color categories in spite of wide-ranging fluctuations in the wavelength-energy composition of the light reflected from them, the color of the afterimage produced by viewing surfaces also retains its color category and is therefore also independent of the wavelength-energy composition of the light reflected from the patch being viewed. There is, in other words, a constancy to the colors of afterimages. This serves to emphasize further the need to search more deeply into the relationship between the responses of single opponent cells and perceptual color opponency on the one hand and the need for a better understanding of whether physiological opponent processes generate perceptual opponent colors or whether the latter are generated after colors are generated.

In 2013, Pridmore argued that most red–green cells reported in the literature in fact code the red–cyan colors. Thus, the cells are coding complementary colors instead of opponent colors. Pridmore reported also of green–magenta cells in the retina and V1. He thus argued that the red–green and blue–yellow cells should be instead called green–magenta, red–cyan and blue–yellow complementary cells. An example of the complementary process can be experienced by staring at a red (or green) square for forty seconds, and then immediately looking at a white sheet of paper. The observer then perceives a cyan (or magenta) square on the blank sheet. This complementary color afterimage is easily explained by the trichromatic color theory (Young–Helmholtz theory); in the opponent-process theory, fatigue of pathways promoting red produces the illusion of a cyan square.

In 2018, Arstila re-examined historical and contemporary work on unique hues, binary hues, and the phenomenal structure of color space—drawing on introspective reports, psychophysical studies, and neurophysiological models—to argue that the posited unique/binary hue structure lacks secure empirical justification and need not be treated as a fundamental feature of human color experience.

Mouland et al. (2021) showed that the subtraction step of the blue-yellow process happens outside of the retina, in the LGN. Commenting on this result, Schwartz wrote "a common pastime of retinal neuroscientists is pointing out that many visual computations studied in the brain, like direction and orientation selectivity, already occur in the retina (and I am guiltier than most in this regard), but in the case of color-opponency in mice, perhaps we should cede one computation to the brain."

A 2023 paper by Conway, Malik-Moraleda, and Gibson provided a comprehensive "review [of] the psychological and physiological evidence for Opponent-Colors Theory" to support the now widely accepted conclusion that "the theory is wrong".

== See also ==
- Impossible color
- CIELAB color space
- Natural Color System
- Complementary colors
- Afterimage
