= Olo (color) =

Imaginary color produced by isolating M cone responses

The most chromatic color inside the sRGB gamut that has a similar hue to olo, according to the researchers

Olo is an imaginary color that can only be seen using specialized tools that exclusively activate the M cone cells on the retina, without activating the L and S cone cells at the same time.

It is impossible to view olo under normal viewing conditions, due to the overlapping sensitivities of M cone cells and S and L cone cells in all wavelengths of visible light. In other words, there is no monochromatic stimulus (the purest type of stimulus that humans can perceive) that activates only the M cones. This means that olo is outside the visible gamut. To get around this, researchers mapped a portion of the retina and individually identified each cone cell as either an S, M, or L cone. They then used lasers to deliver tiny doses of light, targeting the M cone cells and mostly avoiding the S and L cone cells. This was achieved by applying adaptive optics to scanning laser ophthalmoscopy.

The researchers who experienced olo said that the closest color to olo in the sRGB gamut is hexadecimal code #00FFCC.

== Discovery ==
Olo was discovered on April 18, 2025, by scientists at UC Berkeley. The color is named after its LMS color space coordinates (0, 1, 0) spelled out as letters.

Only the five subjects of the Berkeley experiment have officially seen olo. Ren Ng, a co-author of the study, described olo as "more saturated than any colour that you can see in the real world"; the five subjects of the experiment similarly described the color as a "blue-green of unprecedented saturation". Ng and his team are exploring whether the technology used to generate olo could be adapted to enhance color perception in individuals with color blindness to manage the symptoms of color blindness. He further suggested that this approach could even lead to a form of enhanced vision known as tetrachromacy, where individuals may perceive a broader range of colors.

Their square display of olo occupied an angular width of 0.9°, around twice the apparent width of the moon as seen from Earth.

=== Legitimacy ===
Experts in the field have described the technique used to create olo as a significant technical achievement. The Berkeley team generated the color by precisely stimulating individual cone cells in the retina using lasers, creating a color beyond the human visible gamut.

However, some scientists, including John Barbur from City St George's, University of London, have questioned whether olo truly represents a "new" color, saying that its existence is "open to argument". Skepticism within the scientific community regarding the classification of olo as a genuinely novel color has been noted.

The idea of olo has drawn attention beyond the scientific community, with artists expressing interest in creating paints inspired by the color. The Berkeley research team has also received global interest, with requests from reporters seeking to experience the phenomenon firsthand.

== See also ==
- Qualia - Philosophical concept regarding perception of subjective experiences, often applied to the notion of color.
