= Ragnar Granit =

Finnish and Swedish neurophysiologist (1900–1991)

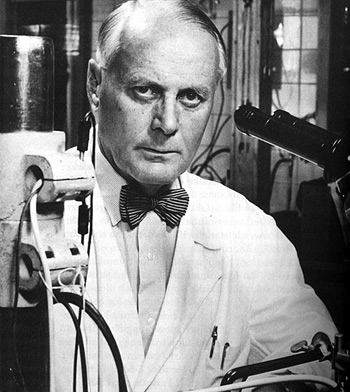
- Ragnar Arthur Granit c. 1956
- Born: Ragnar Arthur Granit; 30 October 1900; Riihimäki, Finland, Russian Empire
- Died: 12 March 1991 (aged 90); Stockholm, Sweden
- Citizenship: Russian Empire (1900-1917); Finnish (1917–1941); Swedish (1941–1991)
- Education: University of Helsinki
- Known for: Retinal neurophysiology Colour vision Motor control
- Awards: Björkénska priset (1948); ForMemRS (1960); Nobel Prize in Physiology or Medicine (1967)
- Scientific career
- Fields: Neurophysiology, physiology
- Workplaces: University of Helsinki; Karolinska Institutet

Ragnar Arthur Granit ForMemRS (30 October 1900 – 12 March 1991) was a Finnish and Swedish neurophysiologist who was awarded the Nobel Prize in Physiology or Medicine in 1967 along with Haldan Keffer Hartline and George Wald "for their discoveries concerning the primary physiological and chemical visual processes in the eye". Granit carried out fundamental research on the retina and the physiological mechanisms of colour vision at the University of Helsinki, and later investigated the neural control of movement at the Karolinska Institutet in Stockholm.

== Early life and education ==
Ragnar Arthur Granit was born on 30 October 1900 in Riihimäki, Finland, at the time part of the Russian Empire, into a Swedish-speaking Finnish family whose roots in Korpo in the Åboland archipelago went back generations. His parents were the forester Arthur Granit and Albertina Helena (Bertie) Malmberg. Granit was raised in Oulunkylä, a suburb of the Finnish capital of Helsinki, and attended the Svenska normallyceum in Helsinki. He spent his childhood and youth summers in Korpo, where he sailed and fished with his cousins Lars-Ivar Ringbom, later an art historian, Anders Ringbom, later a professor of analytical chemistry, and Nils-Erik Ringbom, later a composer and intendent of the Helsinki Philharmonic Orchestra.

Granit grew up in a milieu more oriented towards literature and the arts than the natural sciences. Among his friends and classmates were the artist Torger Enckell and his brothers Olof Enckell, later a professor of Swedish literature, and Rabbe Enckell, who became an author and artist. At Svenska normallyceum, Granit participated in a literary discussion club led by the poet Gunnar Björling. He worked as editor of Studentbladet from 1923 to 1926, contributed to the first issues of the magazine Quosego, founded in 1928 as an organ for the literary avant-garde, and was editor of the magazine Finlands Röda Kors during the 1930s. During this time, Granit also published several articles and works of fiction. Granit was also a member of the Nylands Nation, where he was a curator, and later of Folkhälsan and the Mannerheim League for Child Welfare.

Granit initially studied philosophy at Åbo Akademi University, where his studies included psychology, an area that he later said had interested him greatly. It was his interest in psychology, together with encouragement from relatives, rather than a desire to practise medicine, that led him to choose the Faculty of Medicine at the University of Helsinki. He began conducting research already as a student, initially in psychophysiology, inspired by the philosopher and psychologist Eino Kaila, who was carrying out experimental research at the university's physiological institute. Granit served as assistant at the same institute while pursuing his studies. He graduated with his bachelor's degree in 1926 with the thesis Farbentransformation und Farbenkontrast and defended his thesis in the autumn of that same year, while still a medical candidate. In 1927 he received his licentiate degree and on the same day he also received his doctorate in medicine and surgery.

== Career and research ==
=== International training ===
Granit sought further training at leading research institutions abroad, orienting himself towards the English-speaking world rather than the then more common German academic tradition. A decisive influence was Charles Scott Sherrington at Oxford, the foremost researcher on the central nervous system of his era, who received the Nobel Prize in 1932. Granit later described Sherrington as his most important scientific model.

Granit began his research on the retina at the Johnson Foundation at the University of Pennsylvania in Philadelphia, which was world-leading in visual physiology during the 1930s. Haldan Keffer Hartline, one of the two scientists who would share the Nobel Prize with Granit in 1967, was working there at the same time. Granit's first significant publications, on the components of the electroretinogram and their relation to activity in the optic nerve, were produced in Philadelphia and Oxford.

=== Research in Helsinki ===
In 1929, Granit became docent in physiology at the University of Helsinki, acting professor in 1935, and full professor in 1937. He gathered a group of enthusiastic young researchers around him, building much of their apparatus themselves, and continued to investigate the function of the retina and the mechanisms of colour vision.

Together with Per-Olof Therman (1910–1972), Granit demonstrated that cells in the retina can respond inhibitorily to stimulation, in the same way that Sherrington had shown for other types of nerve cells. Together with Gunnar Svaetichin (1915–1972), he showed that the retina's electrical impulse sensitivity can be divided into three groups — for blue, green, and red — providing the first neurophysiological evidence for the Young–Helmholtz theory of colour vision, which had been proposed in the 19th century. For this work, a new recording technique was developed in Helsinki that made it possible to register nerve impulses from individual nerve cells, a method later used in numerous other studies.

=== Move to Sweden ===
Granit received offers from various parts of the world, including a professorship at the University of Tartu in 1932 and an invitation to Harvard in 1940, but declined them. When he was called to head the neurophysiology department at the Karolinska Institutet in Stockholm, however, he decided to move. A principal reason was the significantly better research resources, but a contributing factor was the Fennicisation campaign that had been pursued at the University of Helsinki during the 1930s; by the end of the decade, only one other professor besides Granit lectured in Swedish at the medical faculty. In 1941, Granit received Swedish citizenship. He was appointed head of the newly founded Nobel Institute and in 1946 received a personal professorship in neurophysiology, which he held until his retirement in 1967.

=== Motor control research ===
From the mid-1940s, Granit shifted his focus to the neurophysiology of motor control. He investigated muscle function and the synapses that control muscle contraction, opening an entirely new field of research that has since been pursued around the world.

The Nobel Prize he received in 1967, together with Hartline and Wald, was awarded specifically "for their discoveries concerning the primary physiological and chemical visual processes in the eye", recognising his earlier work on retinal physiology rather than the motor control research.

=== Legacy ===
Granit was the first Finland-born scientist to receive the Nobel Prize in Physiology or Medicine, and his research group in 1930s Helsinki was the first in Finland to operate at a Nobel Prize level. Most of his students became part of the Finnish "brain drain", going on to become professors and heads of research institutes around the world.

== Awards and honours ==
Granit was appointed a member of the Finnish Society of Sciences and Letters in 1937 and was elected Swedish member number 912 of the Royal Swedish Academy of Sciences in 1944. He was also a board member of Samfundet Nordens Frihet 1942–1945.

Granit was elected an International Member of the American Philosophical Society in 1954. In 1960, Granit was elected a Foreign Member of the Royal Society (ForMemRS).

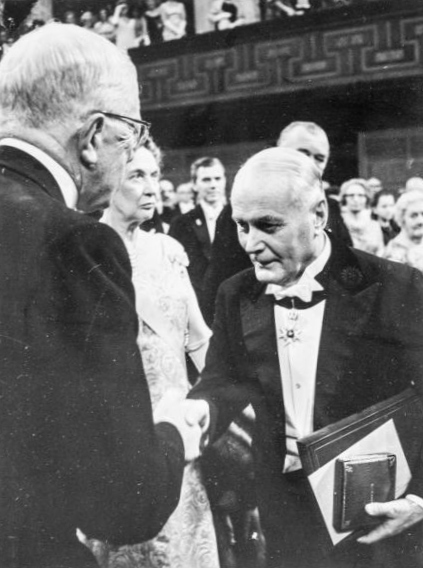
Photograph of the Finnish/Swedish Nobel prize winner Ragnar Granit receiving the prize from the King of Sweden, Gustaf VI Adolf

In 1967 he was awarded the Nobel Prize in Physiology or Medicine. Granit said that he was a "fifty-fifty" Finnish and Swedish Nobel laureate.

Granit was elected an International Member of the United States National Academy of Sciences in 1968. In 1971, he was elected an International Honorary Member of the American Academy of Arts and Sciences.

== Personal life ==
Granit married Baroness Marguerite Emma (Daisy) Bruun (1902–1991) in 1929. He was proud of his Finland-Swedish roots and remained a patriotic Finland-Swede throughout his life, maintaining homes in both Finland and Sweden. In reference works and directories he gave "Stockholm and Korpo" as his home, and despite living in Sweden for decades he retained his Finland-Swedish accent.

Granit died on 12 March 1991 in Stockholm at the age of 90. He and his wife are buried in Korpo, Finland.
