= Young–Helmholtz theory =

Postulated existence of three photoreceptor types in the eye

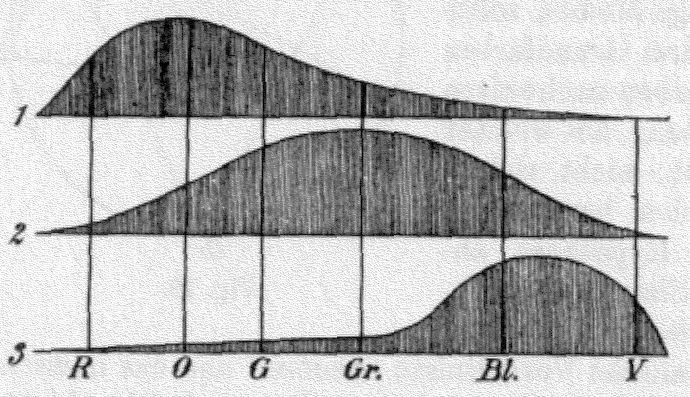
Thomas Young and Hermann von Helmholtz assumed that the eye's retina consists of three different kinds of light receptors for red, green and blue.

The Young–Helmholtz theory (based on the work of Thomas Young and Hermann von Helmholtz in the 19th century), also known as the trichromatic theory, is a theory of trichromatic color vision – the manner in which the visual system gives rise to the phenomenological experience of color.

== History ==
=== Work of Palmer ===
While Young is often credited as the progenitor of trichromatic color theory, a theory of color vision by George Palmer is mostly analogous to Young's, but precedes it by a quarter century. In his Theory of Colors and Vision (1777) and later in his Theory of Light (1786), Palmer claims that the retina has 3 classes of particles that selectively absorb red, yellow and blue rays. The unequal motion of these particles evokes color, and the equal motion thereof evokes white. However, Palmer also claimed that light itself is compounded of only three distinct rays: red, yellow and blue, which differs from the modern understanding (and that of Young), that light is a continuous visible spectrum.

=== Work of Young, Helmholtz and Maxwell ===
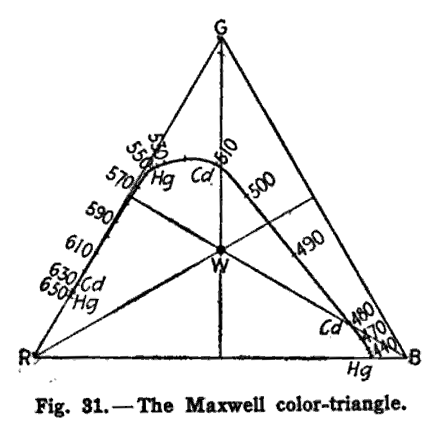
James Clerk Maxwell color triangle.

In 1802, Young postulated the existence of three types of photoreceptors in the eye, with different but overlapping response to different wavelengths of visible light.

Hermann von Helmholtz developed the theory further in 1850: that the three types of cone cell in humans could be classified as short-preferring (violet), middle-preferring (green), and long-preferring (red), according to their response to the wavelengths of light striking the retina. The relative strengths of the signals detected by the three types of cones are interpreted by the brain as a visible color.

For instance, yellow light uses different proportions of red and green, but little blue, so any hue depends on a mix of all three cones, for example, a strong red-sensitive, medium green-sensitive, and low blue-sensitive. Moreover, the intensity of colors can be changed without changing their hues, since intensity depends on the frequency of discharge to the brain, as a blue-green can be brightened but retain the same hue. The system is not perfect, as it does not distinguish yellow from a red-green mixture, but can powerfully detect subtle environmental changes. In 1857, James Clerk Maxwell used the recently developed linear algebra to offer a mathematical proof of the Young–Helmholtz theory.

=== Experimental validation ===
The existence of cells sensitive to three different wavelength ranges (most sensitive to yellowish green, cyanish-green, and blue – not red, green and blue) was first shown in 1956 by Gunnar Svaetichin. In 1983 it was validated in human retinas in an experiment by Herbert Dartnall, James Bowmaker, and John Mollon, who obtained microspectrophotopic readings of single eye cone cells. Earlier evidence for the theory had been obtained by looking at light reflected from the retinas of living humans, and absorption of light by retinal cells removed from corpses.
