= AIC Judd Award =

International prize

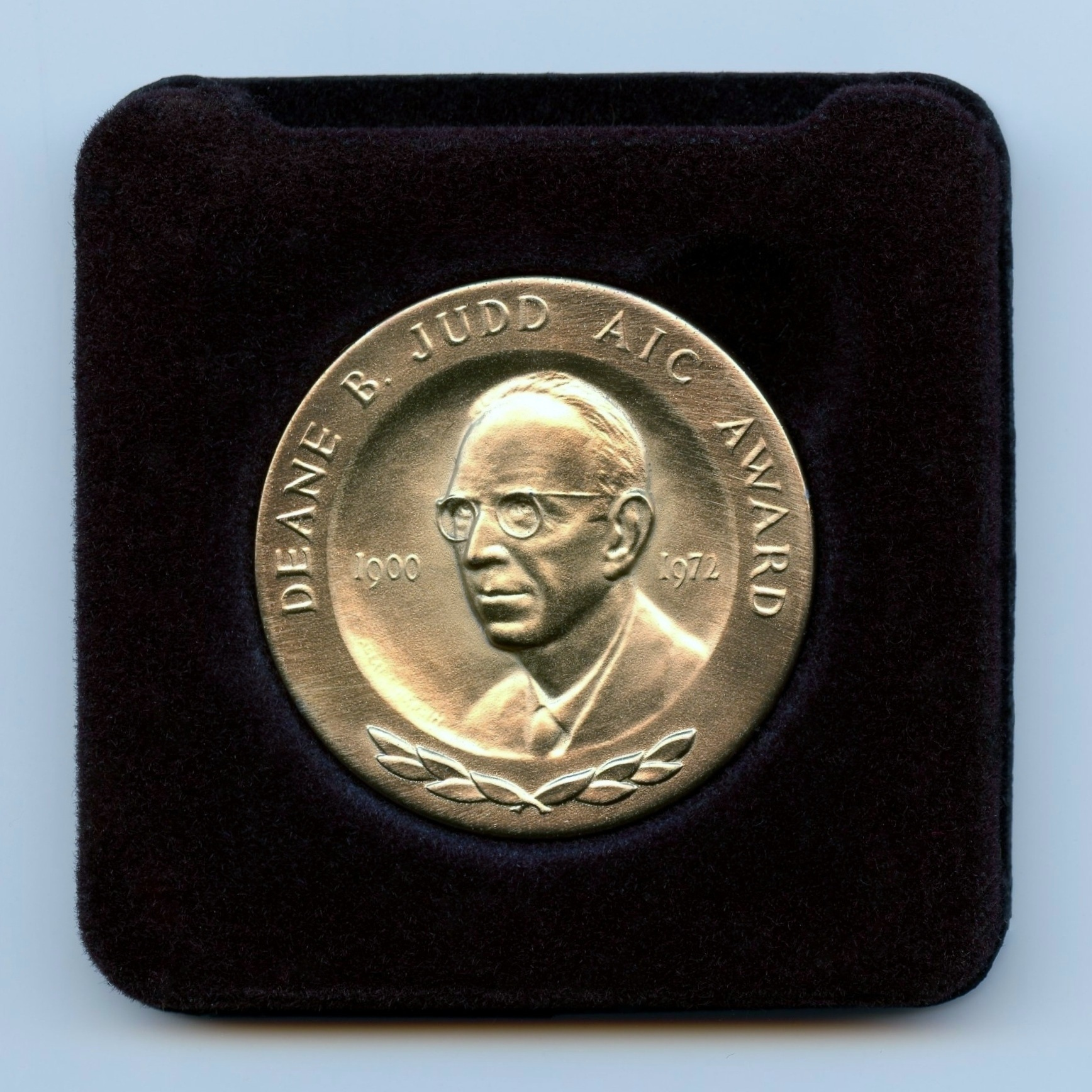
Golden medal of the award, with the portrait of Deane B. Judd

The AIC - Deane B. Judd Award is an international prize, created in 1973 and instituted for the first time in 1975 by the International Colour Association (AIC). It is given to researchers or research groups in recognition of outstanding contributions to the field of color science. The award is named in honor of Deane B. Judd, an American scientist who made significant contributions to colorimetry, color discrimination, color models, and color vision.

The AIC has been carrying out the process of selection of the recipients for this award every two years, since 1975. The selection is an arduous procedure that includes nominations by AIC members and analysis of antecedents of the nominees by a Committee composed of previous recipients of the award and AIC past-presidents. The award is given at AIC Congresses.

== Awardees ==
The researchers who have received this award in the past 50 years are:

- 1975: Dorothy Nickerson (USA);
- 1977: William David Wright (UK);
- 1979: Günter Wyszecki (Germany, USA, Canada);
- 1981: Manfred Richter (Germany);
- 1983: David L. MacAdam (USA);
- 1985: Leo Hurvich & Dorothea Jameson (USA);
- 1987: Robert William G. Hunt (UK);
- 1989: Tarow Indow (Japan, USA);
- 1991: Johannes J. Vos & Pieter L. Walraven (Netherlands);
- 1993: Yoshinobu Nayatani (Japan);
- 1995: Heinz Terstiege (Germany);
- 1997: Anders Hård, Gunnar Tonnquist & Lars Sivik (Sweden);
- 1999: Fred W. Billmeyer Jr. (USA);
- 2001: Roberto Daniel Lozano (Argentina);
- 2003: Mitsuo Ikeda (Japan);
- 2005: John B. Hutchings (UK);
- 2007: Alan R. Robertson (Canada);
- 2009: Arne Valberg (Norway);
- 2011: Lucia Ronchi (Italy);
- 2013: Roy S. Berns (USA);
- 2015: Françoise Viénot (France);
- 2017: Ming-Ronnier Luo (UK);
- 2019: Hirohisa Yaguchi (Japan);
- 2021: John McCann (USA);
- 2023: Rolf G. Kuehni (USA);
- 2025: José Luis Caivano (Argentina).

The contributions of these color scientists cover a wide variety of fields: colorimetry, color vision, color technology, color appearance, visual appearance, color psychology, visual psychophysics, standards and normalization, lighting, etc. K. Fridell Anter has compiled a list of selected publications by these authors.
