= International Colour Association =

Learned association for colour science

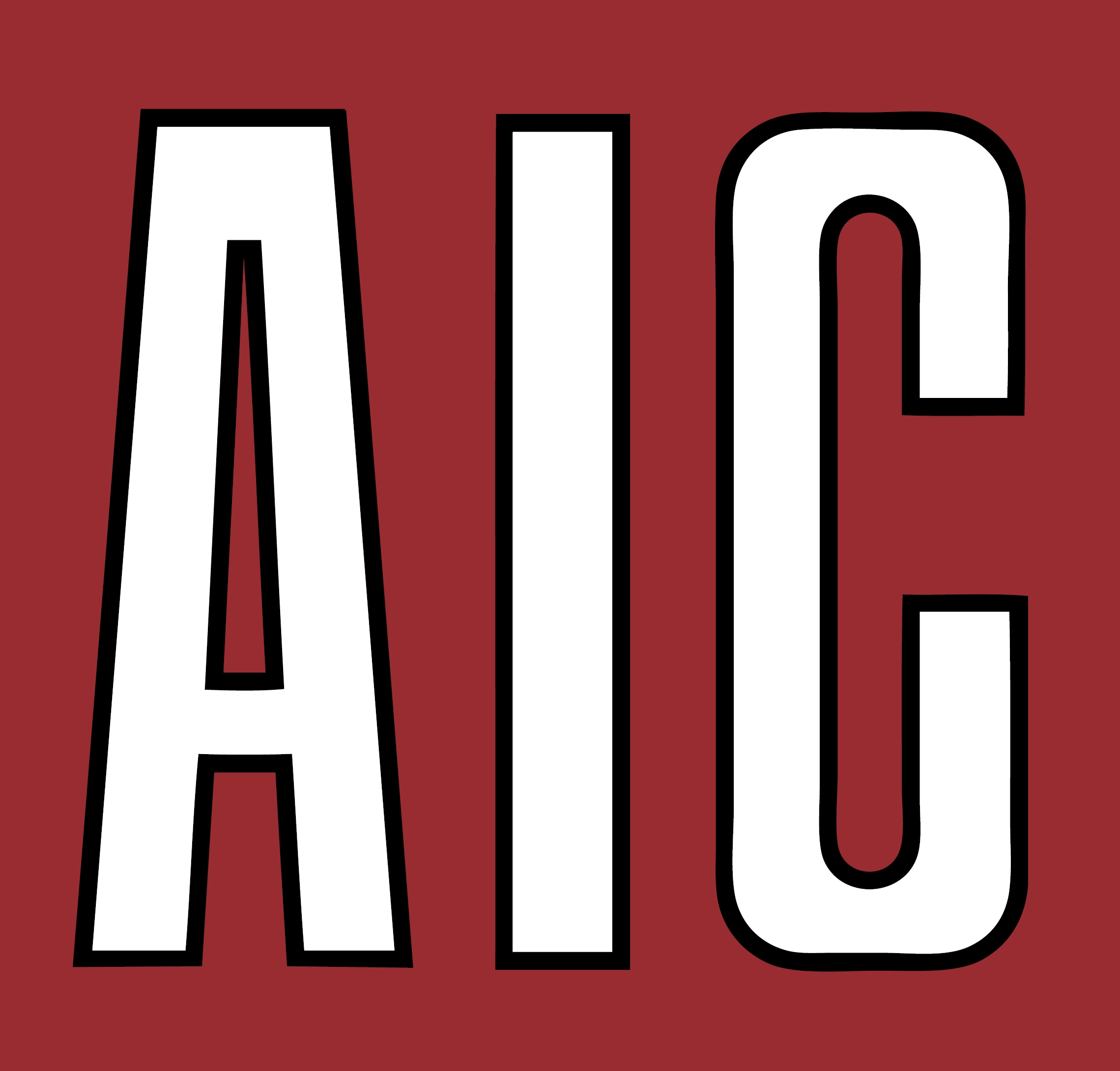
- Abbreviation: AIC
- Formation: 21 June 1967
- Region served: Worldwide
- Website: International Colour Association

The International Colour Association (Association Internationale de la Couleur (AIC), or Internationale Vereinigung für die Farbe) is a learned society whose aims are to encourage research in all aspects of colour, to disseminate the knowledge gained from this research, and to promote its application to the solution of problems in the fields of science, art, design and industry on an international basis. The AIC also aims for a close cooperation with existing international organizations, such as, for example, the International Commission on Illumination (CIE), the International Organization for Standardization (ISO), and the International Commission for Optics (ICO), regarding issues concerned with colour. The AIC will neither duplicate the work of these bodies nor will it attempt to assume any of their responsibilities. In 2009 the AIC agreed on the creation of an International Colour Day, which is celebrated in many countries around the world.

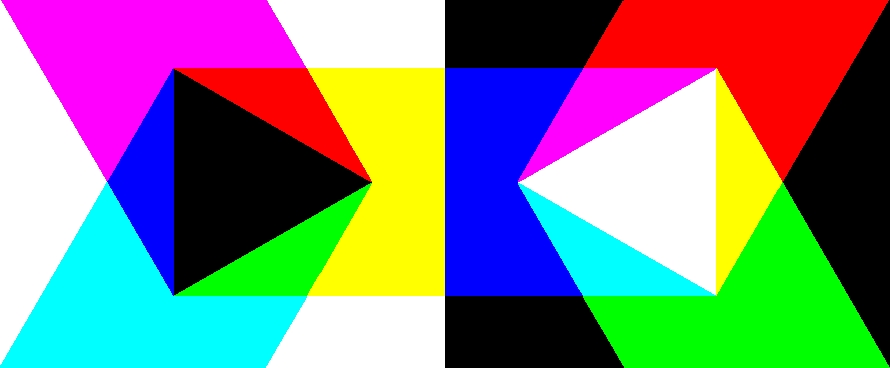

== History ==
The AIC foundation occurred on 21 June 1967 in Washington DC, United States, during the 16th Session of the CIE (Commission Internationale de l’Éclairage). Its presidents have been, in chronological order:

- William David Wright (1967-1969, Great Britain),
- Yves Le Grand (1970-1973, France),
- Tarow Indow (1974-1977, Japan),
- C. James Bartleson (1978-1981, USA),
- Robert William G. Hunt (1982-1985, Great Britain),
- Heinz Terstiege (1986-1989, Germany),
- Alan R. Robertson (1990-1993, Canada),
- Lucia R. Ronchi (1994-1997, Italy),
- Mitsuo Ikeda (1998-2001, Japan),
- Paula J. Alessi (2002-2005, USA),
- José Luis Caivano (2006-2009, Argentina),
- Berit Bergström (2010-2013, Sweden),
- Javier Romero (2014-2015, Spain),
- Nick Harkness (2016-2017, Australia),
- Tien-Rein Lee (2017-2019, Taiwan),
- Vien Cheung (2020-2021, Great Britain),
- Leslie Harrington (2022-2024, USA),
- Maurizio Rossi (2024-2025, Italy),
- Maria Joao Durao (2026-2027, Portugal).

== Congresses ==
Every four years, the AIC organizes international colour congresses. It is also responsible for arranging midterm meetings, which take place two years after the congress, and interim meetings, which take place at intervals corresponding to one and three years after the congress. Congresses feature original papers in all themes and fields related to colour. Interim and Midterm Meetings, instead, are thematically oriented; each meeting concentrates on a specific aspect of colour. The papers presented at congresses and meetings are published in the proceedings, most of which are freely available at their website.

== Members and Executive Committee ==
The regular members of the AIC are colour associations of different countries or regions. In addition, it has individual members (persons), and associate members (other related international societies).

The executive committee of the AIC is made of seven persons: a president, a vice president, a secretary/treasurer, and four ordinary members. This committee, whose seven members must belong to different countries, is renewed every two years by means of elections that take place at the assemblies held during full congresses and midterm meetings.

== Deane B. Judd Award ==
Since 1975, every two years, the AIC gives an international prize to individual researchers or small groups of researchers to recognize outstanding work in the field of colour science: the Deane B. Judd Award. The selection is an arduous procedure that includes nominations by AIC members and analysis of antecedents of the nominees by a committee composed of previous recipients of the award. The colour researchers that have received this award are:

- 1975: Dorothy Nickerson (USA);
- 1977: William David Wright (Great Britain);
- 1979: Günter Wyszecki (Germany, USA, Canada);
- 1981: Manfred Richter (Germany);
- 1983: David MacAdam (USA);
- 1985: Leo Hurvich and Dorothea Jameson (USA);
- 1987: Robert William G. Hunt (Great Britain);
- 1989: Tarow Indow (Japan, USA);
- 1991: Johannes J. Vos and Pieter L. Walraven (The Netherlands);
- 1993: Yoshinobu Nayatani (Japan);
- 1995: Heinz Terstiege (Germany);
- 1997: Anders Hård, Gunnar Tonnquist and Lars Sivik (Sweden);
- 1999: Fred W. Billmeyer Jr. (USA);
- 2001: Roberto Daniel Lozano (Argentina);
- 2003: Mitsuo Ikeda (Japan);
- 2005: John B. Hutchings (Great Britain);
- 2007: Alan R. Robertson (Canada);
- 2009: Arne Valberg (Norway);
- 2011: Lucia Ronchi (Italy);
- 2013: Roy S. Berns (USA);
- 2015: Françoise Viénot (France);
- 2017: Ming Ronnier Luo (Great Britain);
- 2019: Hirohisa Yaguchi (Japan);
- 2021: John McCann (USA);
- 2023: Rolf Georg Kuehni (USA);
- 2025: José Luis Caivano (Argentina).
