= Dorothy Nickerson =

American color scientist

- Dorothy Nickerson (undated)
- Born: August 5, 1900
- Died: April 25, 1985 (aged 84)
- Citizenship: American
- Education: Boston University
- Alma mater: Johns Hopkins University
- Known for: Munsell Soil Color Chart, Nickerson Color Fan (color chart)
- Awards: Godlove Award, IESNA Gold Medal
- Institutions: Munsell Color Company, USDA

Dorothy Nickerson (August 5, 1900 – April 25, 1985) was an American color scientist and technologist who made important contributions in the fields of color quality control, technical use of colorimetry, the relationship between color stimuli and color perceptions, standardization of light sources, color tolerance specification, and others.

== Background ==
Dorothy Nickerson was born on August 5, 1900, and raised in Boston. In 1919, she attended Boston University and in 1923 Johns Hopkins University. She continued her education at summer courses and university extensions at Harvard University, George Washington University, and the Graduate School of the U.S. Department of Agriculture. Her special interest was the science of color, then in significant development.

== Career ==
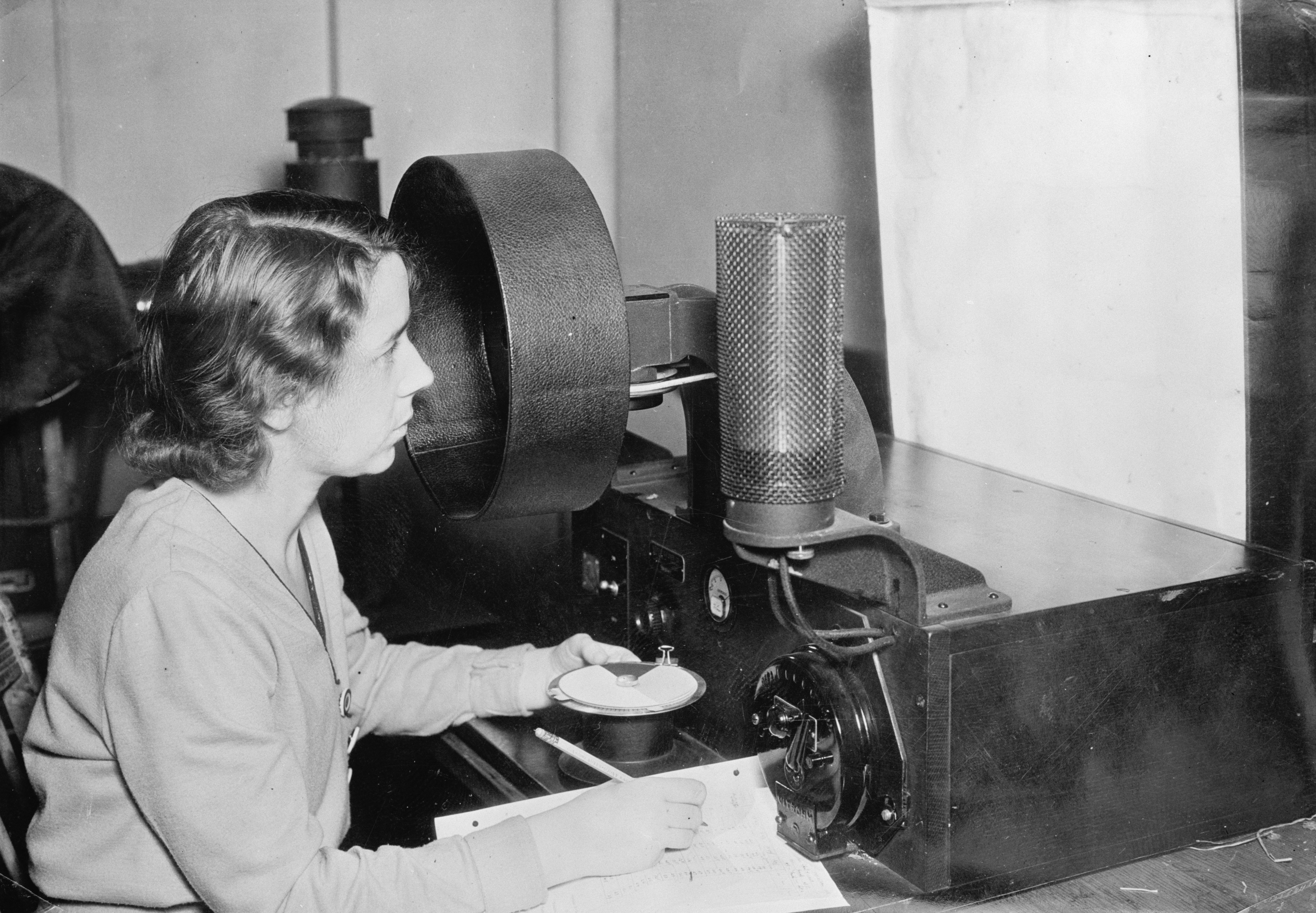
Nickerson measuring the color of a cotton sheet (1938)

In 1921, Nickerson joined the Munsell Color Company as a laboratory assistant and secretary to Alexander Ector Orr Munsell, who had taken over the firm from his father in 1918. In 1922, the firm moved to New York City and in 1923 to Baltimore.

In 1927, Nickerson was offered a position at the United States Department of Agriculture (USDA), where she remained until retiring in 1964. When she joined, color science and technology had no international standards as they came into industrial use. Nickerson prodded instrumental in developing the technology and use in agricultural and industrial settings.

Nickerson was a trustee of the Munsell Color Foundation since 1942, was its president from 1973 to 1975, and assisted in the transfer of the foundation to the Rochester Institute of Technology in 1983 where it helped fund the then new Munsell Color Science Laboratory.

=== Color quality control of agricultural product ===
In the late 1920s Nickerson worked on usage of disk color mixture to define the color quality of cotton and other agricultural products and the conversion of disk mixture data into the CIE colorimetric system of 1931.

=== Standardization of light sources for color assessment and color rendering ===
In the late 1930s, a major occupation was the development of defined light sources for visual assessment of color quality. Later, she was also active in the development and promotion of standard methods for the definition of color rendering of lights.

=== Color tolerance specification ===
In 1936 Nickerson published the first color difference formula for industrial use, based on the addition of increments of Munsell hue, chroma, and lightness scale values. In 1943, together with Newhall, she published realistic representations of a three-dimensional perceptually approximately uniform optimal object color solid. In 1944, together with her assistant K. F. Stultz, she published a colorimetric color difference formula, known as the Adams–Nickerson–Stultz formula, that in modified form eventually became the CIE 1976 L*,a*,b* (CIELAB) color space and difference formula.

=== Munsell color system and its colorimetric definition ===
In 1940, a technical committee of the Optical Society of America (OSA) began a study of the Munsell color system and its definition in the CIE colorimetric system. Nickerson was an important participant in this effort. The final report of the committee was authored by S.M. Newhall, Nickerson, and Deane B. Judd and its result is known as the "Munsell Renotations," the specification of the aim colors of the current system. Nickerson prepared plots of the Munsell colors in the CIE chromaticity diagram that remain in publication today.

=== Color charts ===
In the mid-1940s, Nickerson was active in methods for assessing the color of soils, an effort that found its expression in the Munsell Soil Color Chart, still in use today. In 1957, Munsell issued the Nickerson Color Fan, a color chart for horticultural purposes. Working with Judd, the chair of the OSA committee that developed the OSA Uniform Color Scales, Nickerson as a member of the committee was also a contributor to that effort for over 25 years and wrote a detailed history of the development of the system.

=== Industry associations ===
Nickerson was a member of several color-related national and international associations, including the Optical Society of America (OSA), the US National Committee to the International Commission on Illumination (CIE), the Inter-Society Color Council (ISCC), the International Colour Association (AIC), and the Illuminating Engineering Society of North America (IESNA).

== Personal life and death ==
Dorothy Nickerson died age 84 on April 25, 1985.

== Awards and recognition ==
- ISCC: In 1931 Nickerson became the first individual member of the ISCC and was a lifelong member. In 1961 she received the Godlove Award. In 1983 the eponymous Nickerson Service Award was created.
- OSA: In 1959 Nickerson joined five other women, Christine Ladd-Franklin, Charlotte Moore Sitterly, Gertrude Rand, Louise L Sloan, and Mary E Warga as part of the first class of fellows of the OSA.
- IESNA: In 1970 Nickerson received the Gold Medal of the IESNA.
- AIC: In 1975 Nickerson received the first Judd Award of the International Colour Association.

== Works ==
Nickerson was the author and co-author of some 150 papers and publications, including Color measurement and its application to the grading of agricultural products, USDA Miscell.Publications 580, 1946, 62 p.

Shortly before her death, Nickerson wrote an appreciation of her mentor, Alexander Ector Orr Munsell.
