= International Colour Day =

Annual celebration of colour, held on March 21st

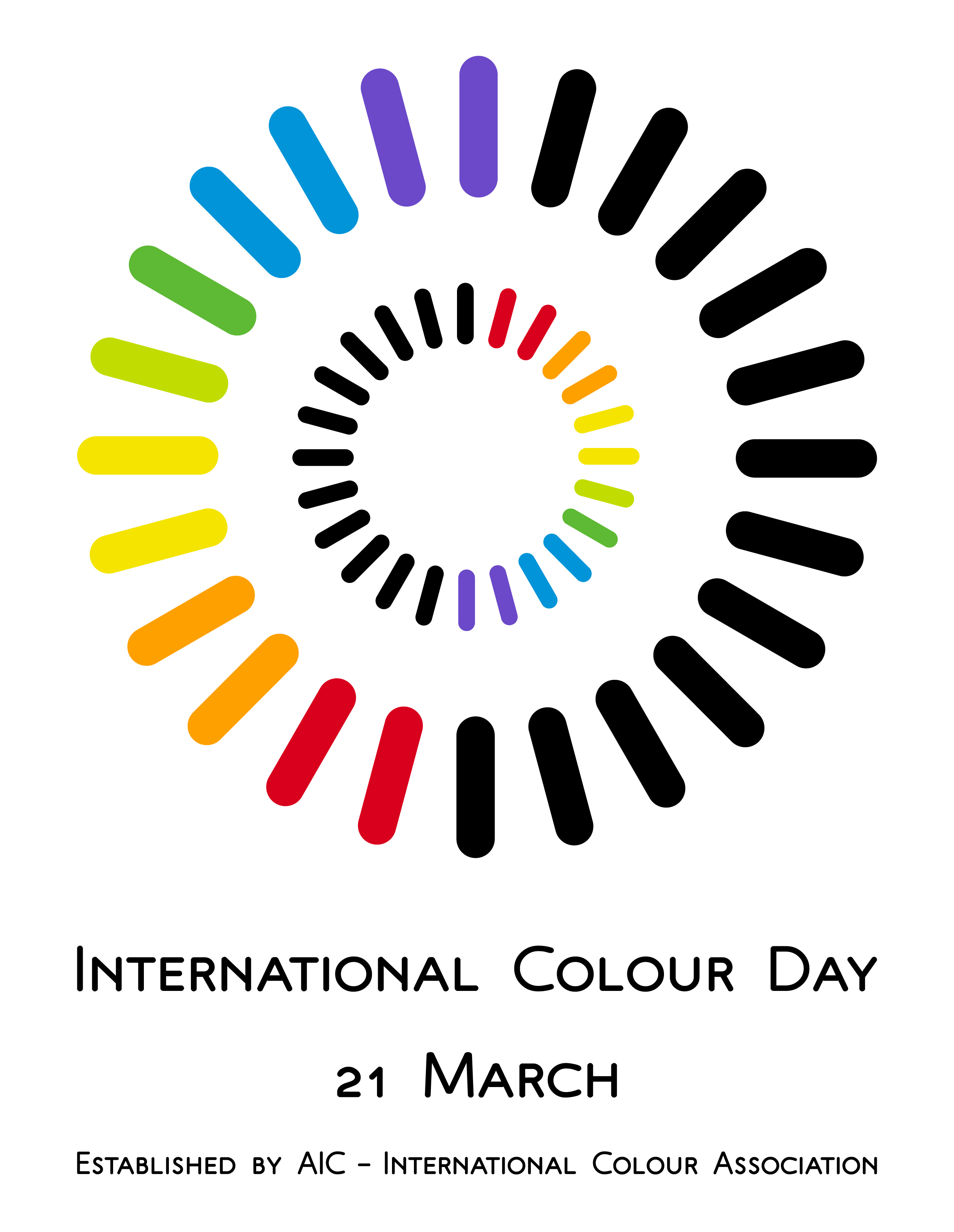
- Official name: International Colour Day
- Also called: ICD
- Observed by: over 30 countries
- Date: March 21
- Next time: 21 March 2027
- Frequency: annual
- Started by: International Colour Association
- Related to: Colour

International Colour Day is an annual event held on March 21 to celebrate colour.

The day was established by the International Colour Association (abbreviated as AIC for its French name, Association Internationale de la Couleur), which is composed of national colour organizations and members representing over 30 countries.

== Background ==
The adoption of a worldwide day of colour was first proposed in 2008 by the Portuguese Color Association, whose president, Maria Joao Durao, presented the idea to the International Colour Association (abbreviated as AIC for its French name, Association Internationale de la Couleur). The proposal was agreed upon in 2009 among the members of the AIC, which is composed of national colour organizations and members representing over 30 countries.

International Colour Day was thereby established, with 21 March adopted as the official date. This date was chosen because it is around the equinox, when "the sun shines directly on the equator," and thus, the duration of day and night are approximately equal in length around the world.

== Logo ==
An international competition for the design of the International Colour Day logo was held at the 2012 interim meeting of the International Colour Association, held in Taipei, Taiwan. As expressed by winning designer Hosanna Yau of Hong Kong, "two circles form an eye, with an equal half of rainbow color and black representing light and darkness, day and night, everyone feast one's eye on the international color day."

== Activities ==
Some of the activities and events that are unfolded on the International Colour Day:

- Arts exhibitions, architectural projects, design, decoration, fashion
- Meetings, debates, scientific events
- Workshops on the use of colour and light for both adults and children.
- Contests on colour and light design.
- Wearing national or regional identity colours.

AIC member countries:

- Australia — Colour Society of Australia
- Belgium — Interdisciplinary Colour Association Belgium
- Brazil — Associação ProCor do Brasil
- Canada — Colour Research Society of Canada
- Chile — Asociación del Color Chile
- Croatia — Croatian Color Society in co-organization with the University of Zagreb
- Finland — Finnish Colour Association (Suomen Väriyhdistys)
- France — Centre Français de la Couleur
- Hungary — Hungarian National Colour Committee
- Italy — Gruppo del Colore – Associazione Italiana Colore
- Japan — Color Science Association of Japan
- Korea — Korean Society of Color Studies
- The Netherlands — Kleurenvisie
- Norway — FORUM FARGE
- Portugal — Portuguese Colour Association (Associação Portuguesa da Cor)
- Russia — Color Society of Russia
- Slovenia — Slovenian Society for Colours
- Spain — Faculty of Sciences of the University of Alicante
- Sweden — Swedish Colour Centre Foundation
- Taiwan — Color Association of Taiwan
- United Kingdom — The Colour Group
- United States — Inter-Society Color Council

== See also ==
- International Colour Association
- Inter-Society Color Council
- The Colour Group
