= Color science =

Scientific study of colors

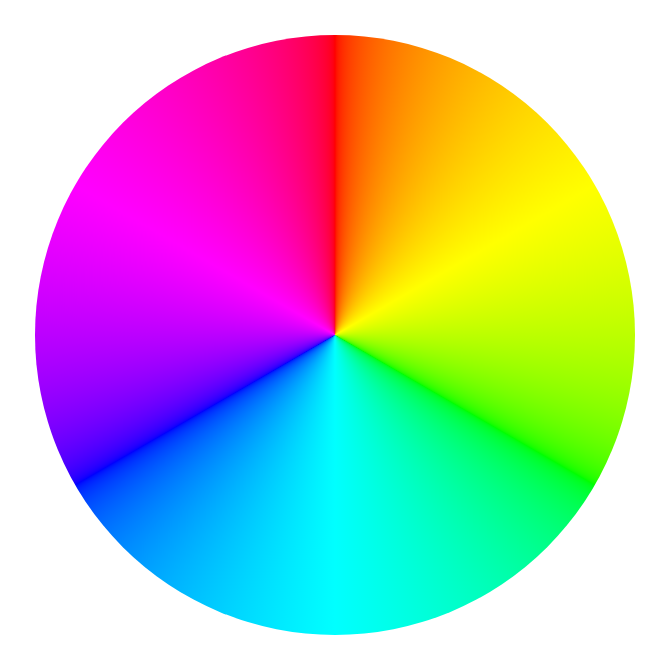
Gradient RGB/CMY color wheel

Color science is the scientific study of color including lighting and optics; measurement of light and color; the physiology, psychophysics, and modeling of color vision; and color reproduction. It is the modern extension of traditional color theory.

== Organizations ==
- International Commission on Illumination (CIE)
- Illuminating Engineering Society (IES)
- Inter-Society Color Council (ISCC)
- Society for Imaging Science and Technology (IS&T)
- International Colour Association (AIC)
- Optica, formerly the Optical Society of America (OSA)
- The Colour Group
- Society of Dyers and Colourists (SDC)
- American Association of Textile Chemists and Colorists (AATCC)
- Association for Research in Vision and Ophthalmology (ARVO)
- ACM SIGGRAPH
- Vision Sciences Society (VSS)
- Council for Optical Radiation Measurements (CORM)

== Journals ==
The preeminent scholarly journal publishing research papers in color science is Color Research and Application, started in 1975 by founding editor-in-chief Fred Billmeyer, along with Gunter Wyszecki, Michael Pointer and Rolf Kuehni, as a successor to the Journal of Colour (1964–1974). Previously most color science work had been split between journals with broader or partially overlapping focus such as the Journal of the Optical Society of America (JOSA), Photographic Science and Engineering (1957–1984), and the Journal of the Society of Dyers and Colourists (renamed Coloration Technology in 2001).

Other journals where color science papers are published include the Journal of Imaging Science & Technology, the Journal of Perceptual Imaging, the Journal of the International Colour Association (JAIC), the Journal of the Color Science Association of Japan, Applied Optics, and the Journal of Vision.

== Conferences ==
- Congress of the International Color Association
- IS&T Color and Imaging Conference (CIC)
- SIGGRAPH
- International Symposium for Color Science and Art

== Selected books ==
- Berns, Roy S. (2019). Billmeyer and Saltzman's Principles of Color Technology (4th ed.). Wiley. doi:10.1002/9781119367314. 3rd ed. (2000).
- Daw, Nigel (2012). How Vision Works: The Physiological Mechanisms Behind What We See. Oxford. doi:10.1093/acprof:oso/9780199751617.001.0001.
- Elliot, Andrew J.; Fairchild, Mark D.; Franklin, Anna, eds. (2015). Handbook of Color Psychology. Cambridge. doi:10.1017/CBO9781107337930.
- Fairchild, Mark D. (2013). Color Appearance Models (3rd ed.). Wiley. doi:10.1002/9781118653128. Author's website. 2nd ed. (2005).
- Hunt, Robert W. G. (2004). The Reproduction of Colour (6th ed.). Wiley. doi:10.1002/0470024275.
- Kuehni, Rolf G. (2012). Color: An Introduction to Practice and Principles (3rd ed.). Wiley. doi:10.1002/9781118533567. 1st ed. (1997).
- Luo, Ming R., ed. (2016). Encyclopedia of Color Science and Technology. Springer. doi:10.1007/978-1-4419-8071-7.
- MacAdam, David L., ed. (1970). Sources of Color Science. MIT Press.
- Reinhard, Erik; Khan, Erum Arif; Akyuz, Ahmet Oguz; Johnson, Garrett (2008). Color Imaging: Fundamentals and Applications. CRC Press. doi:10.1201/b10637.
- Schanda, János, ed. (2007). Colorimetry: Understanding the CIE System. Wiley. doi:10.1002/9780470175637.
- Shamey, Renzo; Kuehni, Rolf G. (2020). Pioneers of Color Science. Springer. doi:10.1007/978-3-319-30811-1.
- Wyszecki, Günter; Stiles, Walter S. (1982). Color Science: Concepts and Methods, Quantitative Data and Formulae (2nd ed.). Wiley.
