= Opponent-process theory =

Psychological and neurological model

Opponent-process theory is a psychological and neurological model that accounts for a wide range of behaviors, including color vision. This model was first proposed in 1878 by Ewald Hering, a German physiologist, and later expanded by Richard Solomon, a 20th-century psychologist.

== Visual perception ==
The opponent-process theory was first developed by Ewald Hering. He noted that there are color combinations that we never see, such as reddish-green or bluish-yellow. Opponent-process theory suggests that color perception is controlled by the activity of three opponent systems. In the theory, he postulated about three independent receptor types which all have opposing pairs: white and black, blue and yellow, and red and green.

These three pairs produce combinations of colors for us through the opponent process. Furthermore, according to this theory, for each of these three pairs, three types of chemicals in the retina exist, in which two types of chemical reactions can occur. These reactions would yield one member of the pair in their building up phase, or anabolic process, whereas they would yield the other member while in a destructive phase, or a catabolic process.

The colors in each pair oppose each other. Red-green receptors cannot send messages about both colors at the same time. This theory also explains negative afterimages; once a stimulus of a certain color is presented, the opponent color is perceived after the stimulus is removed because the anabolic and catabolic processes are reversed. For example, red creates a positive (or excitatory) response while green creates a negative (or inhibitory) response. These responses are controlled by opponent neurons, which are neurons that have an excitatory response to some wavelengths and an inhibitory response to wavelengths in the opponent part of the spectrum.

According to this theory, color blindness is due to the lack of a particular chemical in the eye. The positive after-image occurs after we stare at a brightly illuminated image on a regularly lighted surface and the image varies with increases and decreases in the light intensity of the background.

The veracity of this theory, however, has recently been challenged. The main evidence for this theory derived from recordings of retinal and thalamic (LGN) cells, which were excited by one color and suppressed by another. Based on these oppositions, the cells were called "Blue-yellow", "Green-red" and "black-white" opponent cells. In a recent review of the literature, Pridmore notes that the definition of the color 'green' has been very subjective and inconsistent and that most recordings of retinal and thalamic (LGN) neurons were of Red-cyan color, and some of Green-magenta color. As these colors are complementary and not opponent, he proposed naming these neurons as complementary cells.

== A-process ==
A-process refers to one of the emotional internal processes or responses of the opponent-process theory. The A-process is largely responsible for the initial, usually fast and immediate, emotional reaction to a stimulus. The theory considers it a primary process which may be affectively positive or negative, but never neutral. The theory also proposes that this process automatically causes a B-process, which is subjectively and physiologically opposite in direction to the A-process.

There is a peak response to any emotional stimulus which usually occurs rapidly, usually out of shock, but lasts only as long as the stimulus is present. In a physiological sense, the a-process is where the pupils dilate, the heart rate increases, and the adrenaline rushes.

== A- and B-processes ==
The A- and B-processes are consequently and temporarily linked but were believed to depend on different neurobiological mechanisms. B-process, the other part of opponent-process theory, occurs after the initial shock, or emotion and is evoked after a short delay. A-process and B-process overlap in somewhat of an intermediate area. While A-process is still in effect, B-process starts to rise, ultimately leveling out A-process' initial spike in emotion. A-process ends once the stimulus is terminated, leaves, or ends. Physiologically, this is where breathing returns to normal, pulse slows back to its normal rate, and heart rate starts to drop. The B-process can be thought of as the "after-reaction". Once B-process has ended, the body returns to homeostasis and emotions return to baseline.

Research on the brain mechanisms of drug addiction showed how the A-process is equated with the pleasure derived from drugs and once it weakens, it is followed by the strengthening of the B-process, which are the withdrawal symptoms.

== Motivation and emotion ==
Opponent process theory of drug addiction, also known as the 'standard pattern of affective dynamics'. PK/PD modeling simulations have demonstrated that this pattern can be reproduced by combining shorter opponent processes at a high frequency.

Richard Solomon developed a motivational theory based on opponent processes. Basically he states that every process that has an affective balance (i.e. is pleasant or unpleasant) is followed by a secondary, "opponent process". This opponent process sets in after the primary process is quieted. With repeated exposure, the primary process becomes weaker while the opponent process is strengthened.

The most important contribution is Solomon's findings on work motivation and addictive behavior. According to opponent-process theory, drug addiction is the result of an emotional pairing of pleasure and the emotional symptoms associated with withdrawal. At the beginning of drug or any substance use, there are high levels of pleasure and low levels of withdrawal. Over time, however, as the levels of pleasure from using the drug decrease, the levels of withdrawal symptoms increase.

The theory was supported in a study Solomon conducted along with J.D. Corbit in 1974, in which the researchers analyzed the emotions of skydivers. It was found that beginners have greater levels of fear than more experienced skydivers, but less pleasure upon landing. However, as the skydivers kept on jumping, there was an increase in pleasure and a decrease in fear. A similar experiment was done with dogs. Dogs were put into a so-called Pavlov harness and were shocked with electricity for 10 seconds. This shock was the stimulus of the experiment. In the initial stage (consisting of the first few stimuli) the dogs experienced terror and panic. Then, when they stopped the stimuli, the dogs became stealthy and cautious. The experiment continued, and after many stimuli, the dogs went from unhappy to joyful and happy after the shocks stopped altogether. In the opponent-process model, this is the result of a shift over time from fear to pleasure in the fear-pleasure emotion pair.

Another example of opponent processes is the use of nicotine. In the terms of Hedonism, one process (the initial process) is a hedonic reaction that is prompted by the use of nicotine. The user gains positive feelings through the inhalation of nicotine. This is then counteracted, or opposed, by the second, drug-opposite effect (the opponent process). The drug-opposite effect holds hedonic properties that are negative, which would be the decrease in positive feelings gained by the inhalation of nicotine. The counteraction takes place after the initial hedonic response as a means to restore homeostasis. In short, the use of nicotine jumpstarts an initial, pleasurable response. It is then counteracted by the opponent process that brings one back to their original level of homeostasis. The negative feelings begin to take hold again, which in this case would be the craving of nicotine. Repeated use of the substance will continue to strengthen the opponent process, but the feelings gained through the initial process will remain constant. This dynamic explains tolerance, which is the increase in the amount of drug/substance that is needed to overcome the opponent process that is increasing in strength. This also explains withdrawal syndrome, which occurs by the negative, drug-opposite effects remaining after the initial, pleasurable process dies out.

Leo Hurvich and Dorothea Jameson proposed a neurological model of a general theory of neurological opponent processing in 1974. This led to Ronald C. Blue & Wanda E. Blue's general model of Correlational Holographic Opponent Processing. This model proposes that habituation is a neurological holographic wavelet interference of opponent processes that explains learning, vision, hearing, taste, balance, smell, motivation, and emotions.

Beyond addictive behavior, opponent-process theory can in principle explain why processes (i.e. situations or subjective states) that are aversive and unpleasant can still be rewarding. For instance, after being exposed to a stressful situation (cold pressor test), human participants showed greater physiological signs of well-being than those in the control condition. Self-report measures and subjective ratings show that relief from physical pain can induce pleasant feelings, and a reduction of negative affect. Accordingly, opponent-process theory can also help to explain psychopathological behavior such as non-suicidal self-injury.

== See also ==
- Autonomic nervous system
- Dual process theory
