= Arthur König =

German physicist (1856–1901)

- Born: 13 September 1856; Krefeld
- Died: 26 October 1901 (aged 45); Berlin
- Spouse: Laura Köttgen
- Children: 1

Arthur Peter König (1856–1901) was a German physicist specialized in optics. In 1886, he published an empirical determination of the spectral sensitivity of the human rod and cone sensors with Conrad Dietrici.

== Biography ==
Born with congenital kyphosis, König devoted his short life to physiological optics. he studied in Bonn and Heidelberg, later moved to Berlin in the fall of 1879 where he studied under Hermann von Helmholtz, whose assistant he became in 1882. After obtaining a doctoral degree in 1882, König qualified for a professorial position in 1884. In 1890, he became director of the physical department of the Physiological Institute of the University of Berlin. In the same year König married Laura Köttgen with whom he had a son, Arthur, who became an astronomer. Circulatory problems caused by his kyphosis resulted in his premature death in 1901.

== Career ==
Originally working in physics, König began in 1883 to concentrate on physiological optics where he published over thirty papers, some of seminal importance. Among these are the 1886 paper (together with Conrad Dietrici) Fundamental sensations and their sensitivity in the spectrum, an empirical determination of what in fact is the spectral sensitivity of the human rod and cone sensors of vision.

Earlier attempts at such measurements, but based on much simpler technology, had been made in 1860 by the English physicist James Clerk Maxwell (1831–1879). Using newly developed spectrophotometric equipment and modifications of the experimental procedure König and Dieterici published a more detailed paper in 1892, determining the "fundamental sensations" not only of subjects with normal color vision (trichromats) but also of dichromats and monochromats.

With these measurements König provided evidence for the conjecture that the most common form of color blindness, dichromacy, is due to the absence of one cone type in the eye. Averaged König functions were widely used in psychophysical color stimulus calculations until new data based on a slightly different method were determined by John Guild and William David Wright in 1920s, resulting in the recommendations of standard observer data by the International Commission on Illumination (CIE, German:Commission Internationale de l'Eclairage) in 1931.

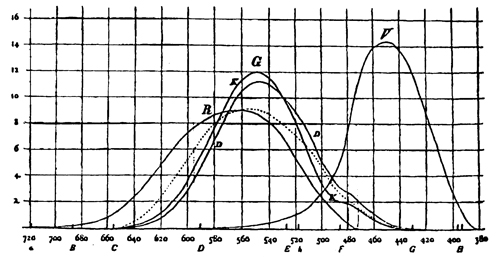
Fundamental color sensations as a function of wavelength

Other important investigations involve the sensitivity of the normal eye for differences in wavelength of light, dependence of the Newton/Grassmann laws of color mixture on light intensity, validity of Fechner's law (postulated by Gustav Fechner) at different light intensities, brightness of spectral hues at different light intensities, and the similarity between the perceptual sensitivity of the rod cells and the absorption spectrum of the rod photopigment, rhodopsin.

König was an active editor. In 1889 he became the sole editor of Verhandlungen der Deutschen Physikalischen Gesellschaft. From 1891 on, together with the psychologist H. Ebbinghaus, he edited the journal Zeitschrift für Psychologie und Physiologie der Sinnesorgane. After Helmholtz's death in 1894, König took on the task of completing preparations for the second edition of the former's Treatise on physiological optics (1896, German:Handbuch der physiologischen Optik) to which he added a bibliography of vision consisting of nearly 8,000 titles.

König's 32 papers on physiological optics were published posthumously in book form in 1903.

== Publications ==
- Vorlesungen Über Die Mathematischen Principien Der Akustik (1898)
- Beiträge zur Psychologie und Physiologie der Sinnesorgane (1891)
- Gesammelte Abhandlungen zur physiologischen Optik (1903)
- Einleitung zu den Vorlesungen über theoretische Physik (1903)
- Vorlesungen über theoretische Physik (1967)

== See also ==
- Optical aberration
