= Color reproduction =

Conversion of physical correlates of color perception into light spectra

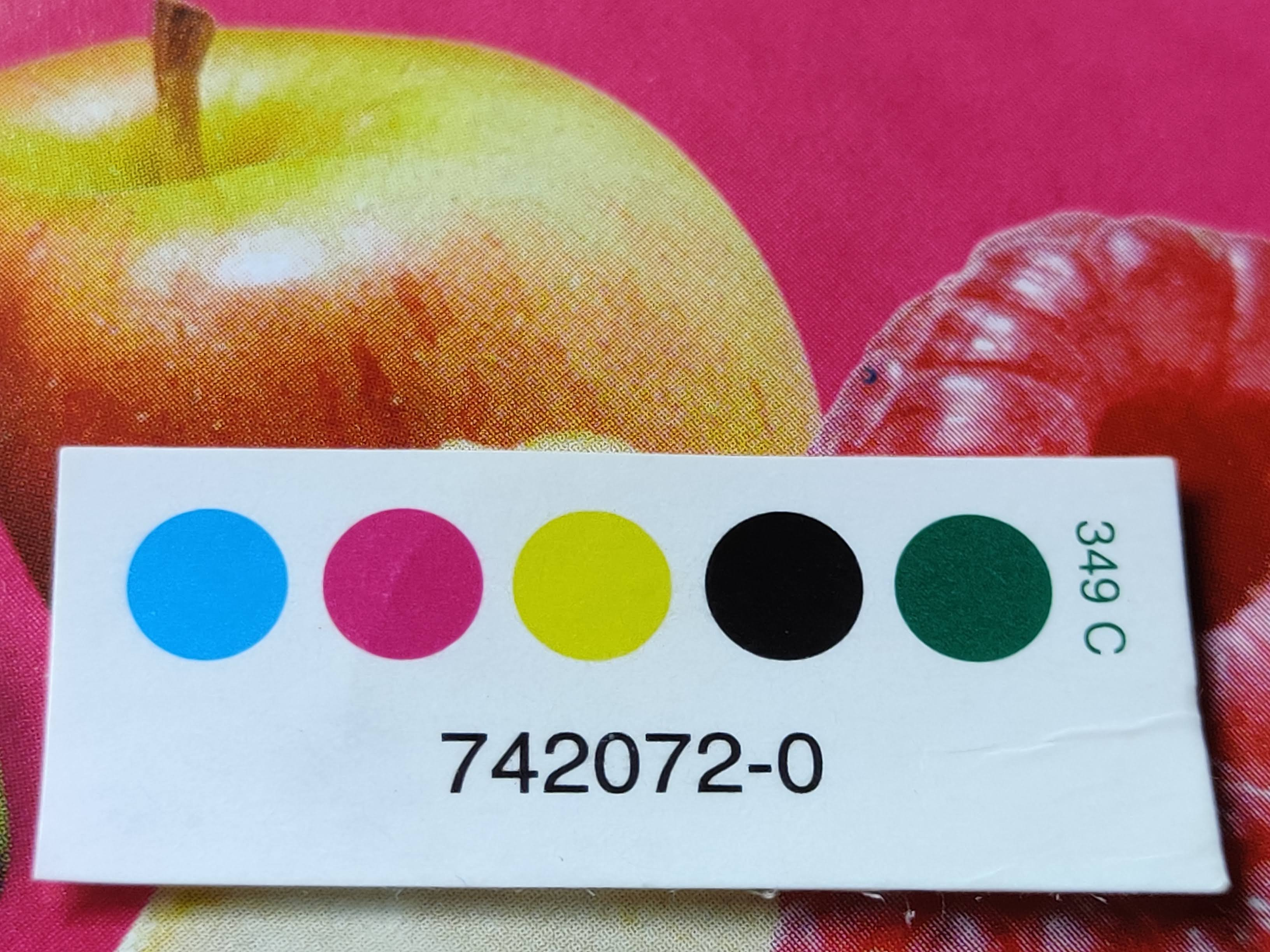
Food packaging printed in CMYK to faithfully reproduce the color of the pictured fruits. A process control patch from elsewhere on the same box helps ensure proper color reproduction.

Color reproduction is an aspect of color science concerned with producing light spectra that evoke a desired color, either through additive (light emitting) or subtractive (surface color) models. It converts physical correlates of color perception (CIE 1931 XYZ color space tristimulus values and related quantities) into light spectra that can be experienced by observers. In this way, it is the opposite of colorimetry.

It is concerned with the faithful reproduction of a color in one medium, with a color in another, so it is a central concept in color management and relies heavily on color calibration. For example, food packaging must be able to faithfully reproduce the colors of the foods therein in order to appeal to a customer. This involves proper color calibration of at least four devices:

- Lighting, which must have a high color rendering index and not give a color cast to the object.
- Camera, which measures the reflected spectrum of the object and converts to a trichromatic color space (e.g. RGB).
- Screen, which reproduces color so a designer can proof the captured image and make color corrections as necessary.
- Printer, which reproduces the final color on paper.
