= Albert König =

Albert König may refer to:

- Albert König (optician) (1871−1946), German optician known for the König eyepiece
- Albert König (painter) (1881–1944), German painter born in Eschede

== See also ==
- Arthur König (1856–1901), German physicist who was known for his work on physiological optics
- Arthur König (astronomer)
