= Yves Le Grand =

French physicist

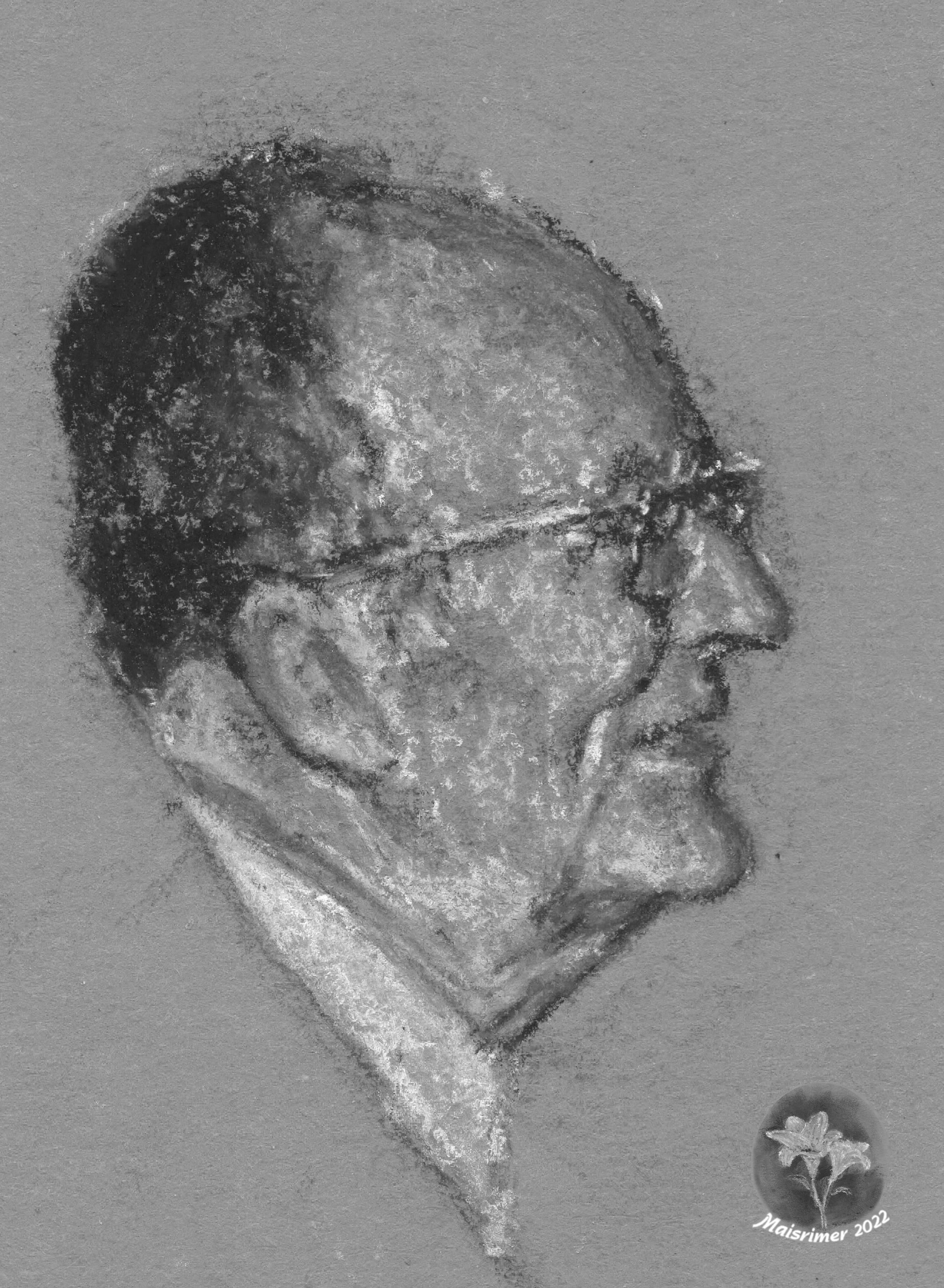
Pr. Yves Le Grand

Yves Le Grand (1908–1986) was a French physicist, specialising in optics and colorimetry, who served as director of the National Museum of Natural History, France from 1971 to 1975, and as vice president of the International Commission on Illumination from 1967 to 1971.
