= John Guild =

British physicist

- Born: 1889
- Died: 1979 (aged 89–90)
- Known for: CIE 1931 color space
- Scientific career
- Fields: Optics; Colorimetry
- Institutions: National Physical Laboratory

John Guild (1889–1979) was a British physicist specialized in optics, later transferred his focus on other studies. Guild worked at the National Physical Laboratory (NPL) at Teddington in England. He was essential to the creation of The Colour Group in the United Kingdom. Later, he became the second chairman of the group from 1943 to 1945, and one of the first honorary members in 1966.

== Contributions ==
He is best known for collecting the data based on empirical evidence on the light sensitivity of the receptors and cones of the human eye. This work and the experiment of William David Wright is the foundation of the international standardization of color measurement, the CIE 1931 Standard Colorimetric Observer.

Other than his contributions to the standardization to colorimetry, he also contributed to a wide range of optical instruments and techniques. In 1924, he designed an optical instrument for the Optics Department of the National Physical Laboratory.
