= Deane B. Judd =

American color scientist (1900–1972)

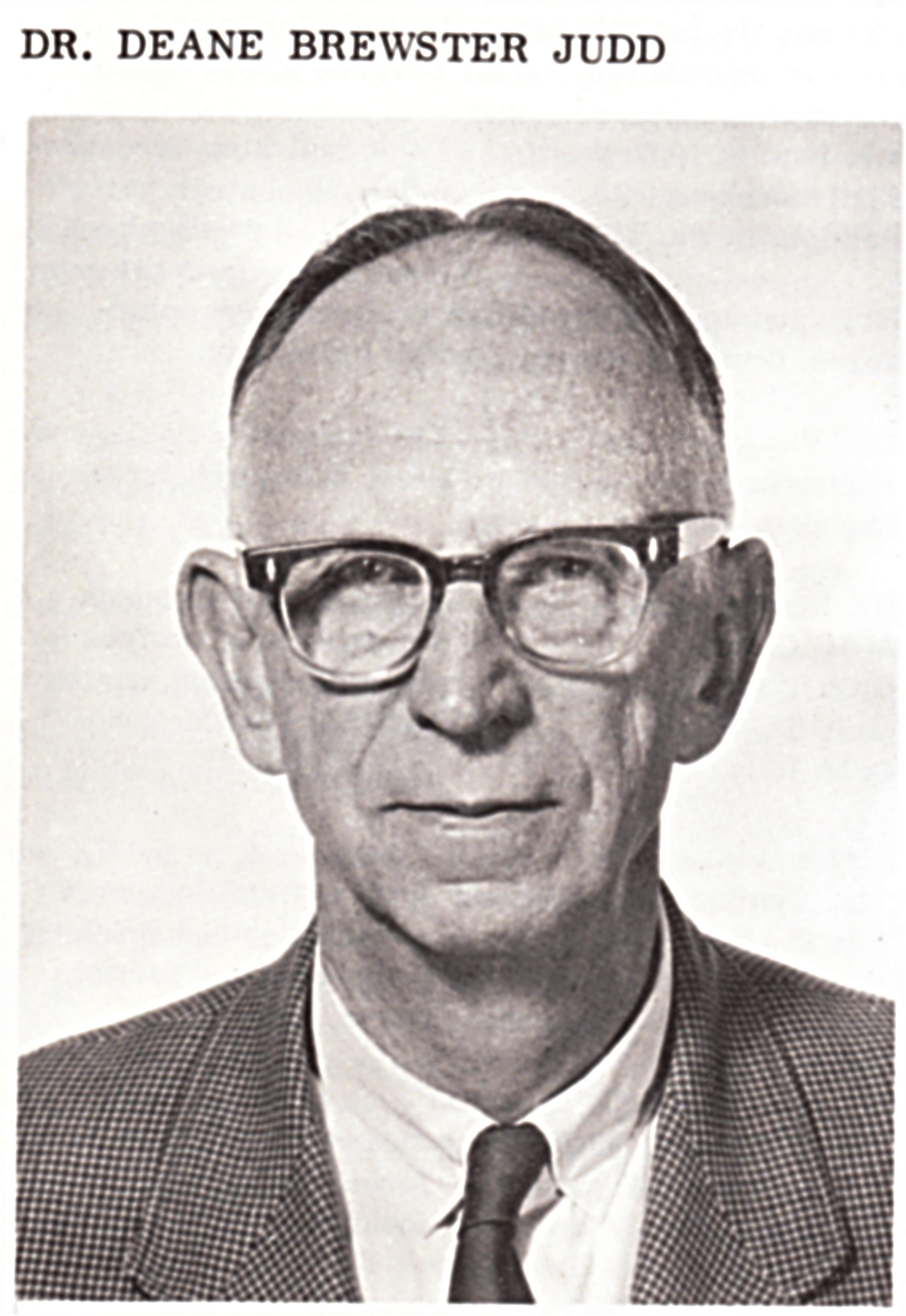
- Dr. Deane B. Judd
- Born: November 15, 1900; South Hadley Falls, Massachusetts, U.S.
- Died: October 15, 1972 (aged 71)
- Scientific career
- Fields: Physics, color science

Deane Brewster Judd (November 15, 1900 – October 15, 1972) was an American physicist who made important contributions to the fields of colorimetry, color discrimination, color order, and color vision.

== Education ==
Judd was born in South Hadley Falls, Massachusetts and attended Ohio State University and Cornell University, where he received a Ph.D. degree in physics in 1926. He was a Munsell Research Associate in colorimetry at the National Bureau of Standards (NBS) in Washington, D.C. in 1926.

== Career ==
In 1927, Judd joined the National Bureau of Standards' permanent staff where he remained until his retirement in 1969 and subsequently continued as a guest worker. During this time he "… made monumental contributions to the science of colorimetry." In addition to his work in research and standardization related to color he represented the United States in international commissions on color science. He was the U.S.'s representative in colorimetry in eight meetings of the International Commission on Illumination (CIE) from 1931 to 1967 and thereby a key force in the development of the CIE standard system of colorimetry, with its definitions of standard observers in 1931 and 1964, standard illuminants B and C, work resulting in upgraded daylight illuminants like D6500, definition of colorimetric purity and other matters. Largely responsible for the coining of the term “psychophysics” he wrestled throughout his career with the relationship between color stimuli and color perception.

Colorimetric system: Judd introduced the concept of keeping luminosity and chromaticness separate in the CIE system. He was active in the colorimetric definition of color temperature and introduced the CIE colorimetric system to U.S. industrial industries. Together with D. L. MacAdam and G. Wyszecki, he used in 1964 the method of principal component analysis to demonstrate that natural daylights are largely composed of three components from which daylights at any correlated color temperature can be defined (CIE method of calculating D-illuminants).

Color difference: In a series of papers in the 1930s, Judd represented then-available color scaling data first into a chromaticity diagram based on color matching functions introduced by the Optical Society of America in 1922, then represented the resulting diagram in a Maxwell-type primary triangle, and finally the resulting unit difference ellipses into the CIE chromaticity diagram. This work became the basis for the CIE u,v color difference diagram in 1960, slightly modified into the 1976 CIELUV color difference space. In 1939, he was instrumental in developing the NBS color difference formula. When in 1947 at the suggestion of the U.S. National Research Council the Optical Society of America (OSA) undertook to develop a perceptually uniform color space, Judd became its chairman and remained in that position until 1968, when David L. MacAdam assumed the chairmanship, with results published in 1974. One of the key findings was “that strictly uniform color scales of all kinds are not homologous with Euclidean space” to which Judd proposed a solution implemented in the OSA Uniform Color Space.

Systematic color names: The perceived need for systematic naming of colors resulted in 1939 in ISCC-NBS Method of Designating Colors, based on the Munsell color system, with a revised edition published in 1955.

Color constancy: Judd in 1940 and later, together with Helson and Warren in 1952, presented results of meticulous work on the subject of color constancy.

Miscellaneous: In connection with his work at NBS, Judd investigated impaired color vision, whiteness measurement of paper, opacity, color stimulus measurement, a flattery index for artificial light sources, and other subjects. In 1951, he proposed a modification of the CIE 1924 luminous efficiency function V(λ) below 460 nm that became known as Judd-modified V(λ), not implemented in the CIE system but used in some vision research work. In addition to his positions at the CIE, Judd was president of the Optical Society of America from 1953–1955 and of the Inter-Society Color Council from 1940-1944. He was president of the board of trustees of the Munsell Color Foundation from 1942-1972. (1)

In his homage, the International Colour Association, AIC, instituted a prize that since 1975 is bestowed every two years to persons who have made relevant contributions in color research: the AIC Judd Award.

He received numerous awards over his career, including the Optical Society's highest honor, the Frederic Ives Medal in 1958. He was a member of that society's inaugural class of Fellows the following year.

== Publications ==
Judd was the author of Color in Business, Science, and Industry, published in three editions, the latter two in collaboration with G. Wyszecki (the third published posthumously). He is the author of more than 200 articles. A selection of 57 of these was published by the NBS in 1979.

== See also ==
- The Optical Society § OSA presidents
