= William David Wright =

English physicist

- Born: 6 July 1906; England
- Died: 4 June 1997 (aged 90); England
- Education: Imperial College London (BSc, PhD)
- Spouse: Dorothy Hudson (1932)
- Children: 2 (1 deceased)
- Awards: C.E.K. Mees Medal (1975)
- Scientific career
- Fields: Colourimetry; Optics

William David Wright (1906–1997) was an English physicist who specialised in colour vision. He was known for his contribution to measuring the colours of the spectrum by adding different beams of red, green and blue lights together. He also was the first person to discover tritanopia. This study together with the similar study conducted by John Guild forms the basis of the international standard for colour measurement. The method is still in universal use today.

== Biography ==
Wright earned his BSc in 1928 and his PhD in 1930 from Imperial College London.

Wright was born on 6 July 6, 1906 in England and died on 4 June 4 1997 in England. He married Dorothy Hudson in 1932. They had 2 children. Hudson passed in 1990.

== Awards ==
- C.E.K. Mees Medal (1975)
- Deane B. Judd Award, from the International Colour Association (1977)
