= Inter-Society Color Council =

The Inter-Society Color Council (ISCC) is a non-profit learned society which was created in 1931 to advance the understanding and application of visual color as it relates to science, industry, and art. The Council also serves to coordinate between different organizations in the United States for which color plays a major role (for example, design, printing, or computer graphics). The Council is composed of individual members and Sustaining Members, and supplies the United States' representatives to the International Commission on Illumination. The society maintains three interest groups to provide focus for presentations at conferences: Fundamental and Applied Color Research, Industrial Applications of Color, and Art, Design, and Psychology.

== Journal ==
The Council endorses the international journal Color Research and Application, and encourages the submission of such reports and articles to this journal for consideration for publication. Reprints of such publications and of others that may be of interest to Council members may from time to time be made available to all members.

== Conferences ==
The society hosts its annual meeting as well as special topics meetings. In addition, it participates in meetings of other societies. The annual meeting includes meetings of the Project Committees and sessions of three interest groups:

- Fundamental & Applied Color Research
- Industrial Application of Color
- Art, Design & Psychology

Special topics meetings include presentations on one or more areas specific to the meeting. The Council is also active in promoting color education, including development of programs and resources for schools, along with the Colour Literacy Project.

== Awards ==
The society presents three awards, the Godlove Award, the Macbeth Award, and the Nickerson Award.

== Past leaders ==
=== Chairs ===
- 1931 E. N. Gathercoal
- 1933 A. E. O. Munsell
- 1934–1935 M. H. Rorke (acting chair)
- 1936 M. R. Paul
- 1938 F. L. Dimmick
- 1940 D. B. Judd
- 1942 D. B. Judd
- 1944 M. J. Zigler
- 1946 R. M. Evans
- 1948 I. H. Godlove
- 1950 I. A. Balinkin
- 1952 E. I. Stearns

=== Presidents ===
- 1954 D. Nickerson
- 1956 Waldron Faulkner
- 1958 W. C. Granville
- 1960 G. L. Erikson
- 1962 W. J. Kiernan
- 1964 R. E. Pike
- 1966 W. L. Rhodes
- 1968 F. W. Billmeyer, Jr.
- 1970 R. M. Hanes
- 1972 R. S. Hunter
- 1974 R. E. Derby
- 1976 C. W. Jerome
- 1978 F. Grum
- 1980 W. D. Shaeffer
- 1982 L. A. Graham
- 1984 J. S. Davenport
- 1986 A. B. J. Rodrigues
- 1988 J. T. Luke
- 1990 H. S. Fairman
- 1992 P. J. Alessi
- 1994 R. L. Connelly
- 1996 E. C. Carter
- 1998 M. H. Brill
- 2000 J. Ladson
- 2002 D. C. Rich
- 2004 J. Zwinkels
- 2006 R. Buckley
- 2008 M. Nadal
- 2010 F. O'Donnell
- 2012 S. Fernandez
- 2014 J. Conant
- 2016 J. Dimas
- 2018 R. Shamey
- 2020 D. Wyble
- 2022 M. Maggio

== See also ==
- American Association of Textile Chemists and Colorists
- American Society for Photogrammetry and Remote Sensing
- ASTM International
- Color Association of the United States
- International Color Consortium
- International Colour Association
- International Organization for Standardization
