= David MacAdam =

American physicist and color scientist

David Lewis MacAdam

David Lewis MacAdam (July 1, 1910 – March 9, 1998) was an American physicist and color scientist who made important contributions to color science and technology in the fields of colorimetry, color discrimination, color photography and television, and color order.

== Education ==
MacAdam grew up in Upper Darby Township, Pennsylvania, where he graduated from Upper Darby High School in 1928. He attended Lehigh University in Bethlehem, Pennsylvania. In 1936, he received a PhD in physics from MIT. Under Prof. Arthur C. Hardy, he originated the first course in color measurement and assisted Hardy in the preparation of “Handbook of Colorimetry,” published in 1936.

== Career ==
Upon graduation MacAdam joined the Research Laboratories of the Eastman Kodak company in Rochester, New York. He retired from the company in 1975. Subsequently, he was named adjunct professor at the University of Rochester, Institute of Optics where he remained active until 1995. At Eastman Kodak, among many other things, he helped to establish the theoretical basis for color photography, including color masking as compensation for unwanted dye layer absorptions.

=== Optimal object color limits ===
While still studying, MacAdam published in 1935 two papers on the theory of optimal object colors in which he showed the results of his calculations of the optimal object color solid raised over the CIE chromaticity diagram, using the newly established CIE standard observer and illuminant C and A data from 1932.

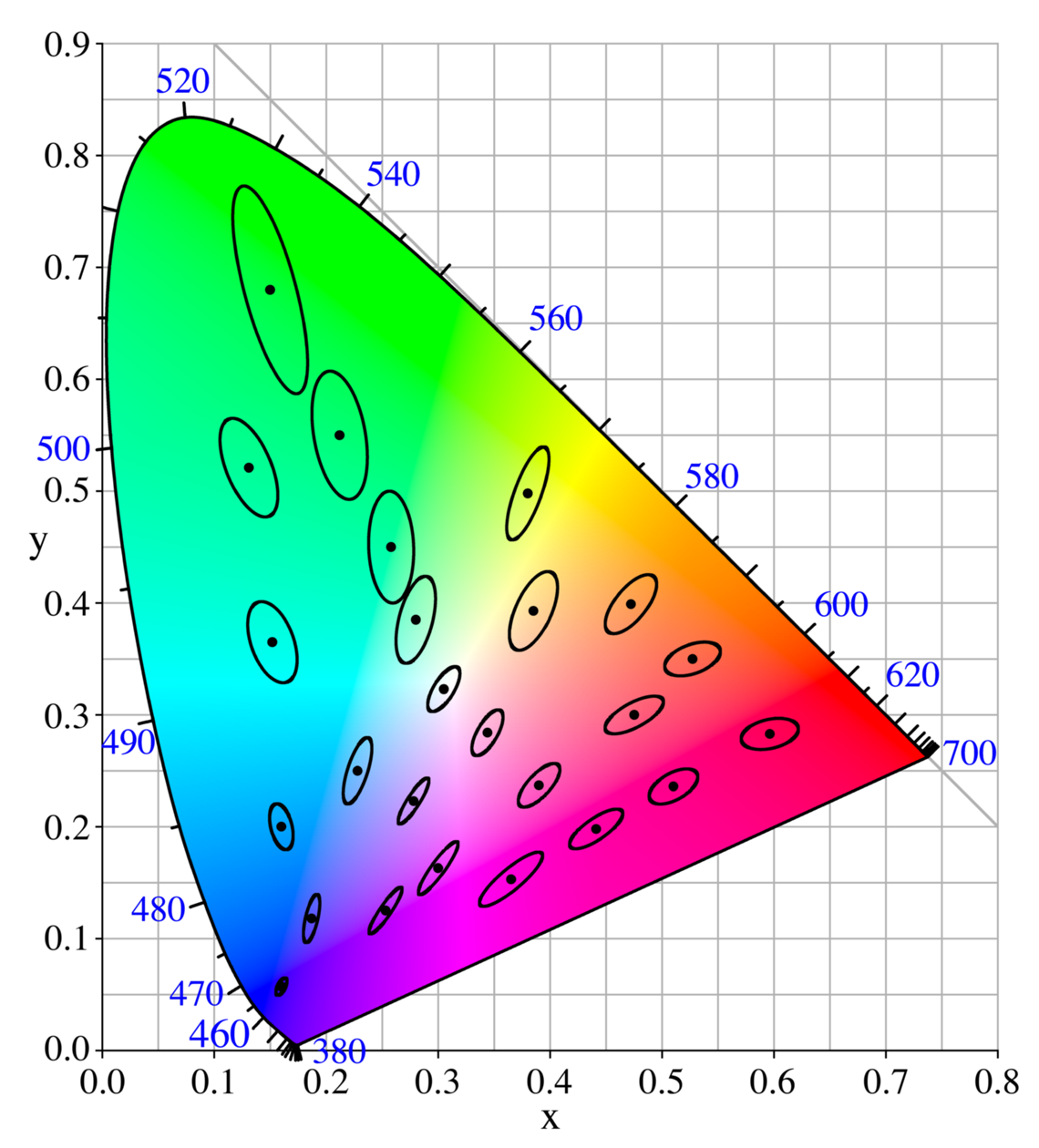
MacAdam ellipses

=== MacAdam ellipses ===
One of MacAdam's best known contributions was in support of technological color control. Assuming that the basis of color difference perception was the statistical error in matching the appearance of a given color stimulus he conducted an extensive experiment with one observer, the result of which was expressed in the CIE chromaticity diagram in form of statistically derived ellipses, published in 1942 (See Fig. 1). However, the resulting Friele–MacAdam–Chickering color difference formula proved less effective in predicting perceived color differences than formulas derived on other bases. In attempting to convert the ellipses to circles of equal size MacAdam encountered the non-Euclidean nature of psychophysical color space.

=== Instrumentation and computation ===
In the mid-1940s MacAdam pioneered the use of computers in colorimetric computations, established Hardy's reflectance spectrophotometer as a reliable industrial measuring instrument, and invented a tristimulus integrator as an accessory.

=== Principal component analysis of daylight ===
With Deane B. Judd and Günter Wyszecki, MacAdam performed the first principal component analysis of phases of daylight of various correlated color temperatures, demonstrating that they can be represented as linear combinations of a limited number of spectral components.

=== Optical Society of America Uniform Color Scales ===
MacAdam was a leading member of the committee of the Optical Society of America that in 1947, at the suggestion of the U.S. National Research Council, began work on a perceptually uniform colorimetric model of the color solid. Upon the retirement of its first chairman D. B. Judd, MacAdam was elected chair. The result of the committee's work was published in 1974 as ‘Uniform Color Scales,’ with OSA publishing a related color atlas with 558 samples in 1977.

== Publications ==
In addition to his contributions to Handbook of Colorimetry (1936) he was a major contributor to OSA's 1953 book The Science of Color. His interest in the history of color science resulted in publication in 1970 of Sources of Color Science, a compilation of 26 seminal papers on color science, from Plato to Le Gros Clark, several translated for the first time into English. In 1981 he published Color Measurement: Theme and Variations, a presentation of fields of color science in which he has made important contributions. He is also the author of some 100 peer-reviewed journal articles.

MacAdam was president of the Optical Society of America in 1963 and editor of the Journal of the Optical Society of America from 1964 to 1975. He was active in the Inter-Society Color Council and the Commission Internationale de l’Eclairage (CIE). He received honors from many societies, including the Frederic Ives Medal of the Optical Society of America in 1974.

== See also ==
- MacAdam ellipse
- Optical Society of America § Past Presidents of the OSA
- OSA-UCS
