= Leo Hurvich =

Leo Maurice Hurvich (September 11, 1910 – April 25, 2009) was an American psychologist who conducted research into human color vision. He was married to fellow cognitive psychologist Dorothea Jameson. The pair collaborated on much of their work, including an elaboration on the opponent process theory. Hurvich was a member of the National Academy of Sciences and he received the APA Award for Distinguished Scientific Contributions to Psychology from the American Psychological Association.

== Biography ==
Hurvich attended Harvard University, earning undergraduate and doctoral degrees. He spent several years working at Harvard before he became a researcher at Eastman Kodak. While working for Kodak, Hurvich was called before the House Un-American Activities Committee. Massachusetts Institute of Technology mathematics faculty member W. T. Martin testified that he was a former communist and he said that he thought Hurvich had been part of a circle of communists at Harvard. Hurvich asserted his right not to testify before the committee.

From 1957 to 1962, he was on the faculty of New York University. Hurvich was a Guggenheim Fellow in 1964. He finished his career at the University of Pennsylvania, from which he retired in 1979. He was married to Dorothea Jameson, a psychologist with whom he collaborated on his vision research. The pair conducted important research that quantified the opponent process theory of color vision. Hurvich and Jameson's adaptation of the opponent process theory became known as a more complete explanation of color vision than the Young-Helmholtz theory.

Hurvich was elected to the National Academy of Sciences in 1975. Jameson and Hurvich shared the 1971 Howard Crosby Warren Medal from the Society of Experimental Psychologists and they were among four recipients of the 1972 APA Award for Distinguished Scientific Contributions to Psychology from the American Psychological Association. Hurvich received the 1982 Edgar D. Tillyer Award from the Optical Society of America.

Jameson died in April 1998. Hurvich died at his New York City home in 2009.
