= The Colour Group =

British organisation

The Colour Group (Great Britain) is a registered charity based in the United Kingdom. It was founded in 1940 as in interdisciplinary society concerned with all aspects of colour, such as its measurement, perception, and reproduction. It organises monthly meetings, mainly in London, and an annual exhibition.

== Arms ==
Coat of arms of The Colour Group

Notes
Granted 30 September 2013
Crest
Two stone steps upon the lower three tubes of oil paint palewise Proper and upon the higher a lion sejant affronty Gules supporting between the rear legs with the sinister forepaw a Newton’s Disc the colours fading towards the centre Proper and holding aloft in the dexter forepaw a prism Argent the tail disposed to the sinister perched thereon a Morpho Butterfly Azure.
Escutcheon
Bleu Celeste a rainbow bendwise enarched throughout Proper surmounted by two pallets Or abutting a pile reversed in base Argent.
Motto
Coloribus Videamus
