= Dorothea Jameson =

American neuropsychologist (1920–1998)

- Born: November 16, 1920; Newton, Massachusetts, U.S.
- Died: April 12, 1998 (aged 77)
- Education: Wellesley
- Spouse: Leo M. Hurvich
- Awards: Warren Medal of the Society of Experimental Psychologists

Dorothea Jameson (November 16, 1920 – April 12, 1998) was an American cognitive psychologist who greatly contributed to the field of color and vision.

She was born in Newton, Massachusetts. Jameson went to Wellesley College. She elected psychology as her major in her first year because she was "intrigued that freshmen required special permission to enroll". She graduated in 1942. While at Welleseley she volunteered as a research assistant at Harvard, where she met her future husband, Leo Hurvich. They married in 1948.

Jameson was later appointed as a full professor of the University of Pennsylvania in 1972. She was awarded honorary degrees from the University of Pennsylvania in 1972 and the State University of New York in 1989.

She died unexpectedly on April 12, 1998, from a previously undiagnosed lung cancer.

== Vision studies ==
While still an undergraduate at Wellesley, Jameson worked as a research assistant at Harvard, where she helped improve the accuracy of visual rangefinders used during World War II. Jameson continued to study vision at Harvard in 1947. At that time Ralph Evans, then head of the Color Control Division at Eastman Kodak, recognized that understanding color—both in the 3-dimensional world and in photographs—depends crucially on understanding perceptual processes and so recruited researches to work on visual perception.

In 1957, Jameson together with her husband Hurvich provided quantitative data for Hering's opponent process color theory. It was called the "hue cancellation method". Hue cancellation experiments start with a color (e.g. yellow) and attempt to determine how much of the opponent color (e.g. blue) of one of the starting color's components must be added to eliminate any hint of that component from the starting color.

In 1982 Jameson won the Edgar D. Tillyer Award from The Optical Society for her contributions to our understanding of visual processes.
