= International Commission on Illumination =

International authority on light, illumination, colour, and colour spaces

- Commission Internationale de l'éclairage; Internationale Beleuchtungskommission
- Abbreviation: CIE
- Formation: 1913; 113 years ago
- Type: INGO
- Location: Vienna, Austria
- Region served: Worldwide
- Official language: English, French, German
- President: Jennifer Veitch
- Website: cie.co.at

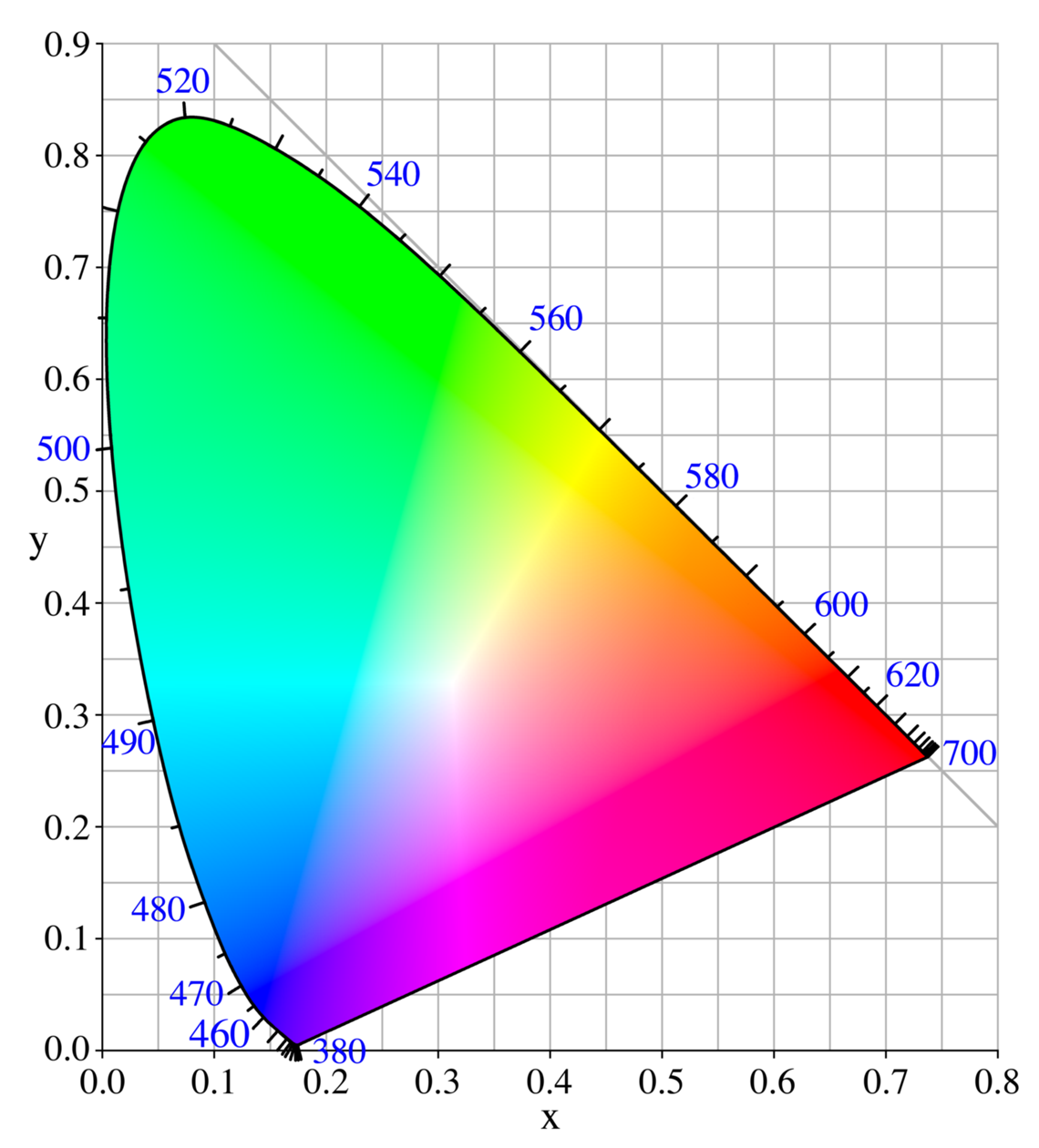
The CIE 1931 colour space chromaticity diagram with wavelengths in nanometers. The colors depicted depend on the color space of the device on which the image is viewed.

The International Commission on Illumination (abbreviated CIE for its French name, Commission internationale de l'éclairage, but historically abbreviated ICI in English) is the international authority on light, illumination, colour, and colour spaces. It was established in 1913 as a successor to the Commission Internationale de Photométrie, which was founded in 1900. It is based in Vienna, Austria.

== Organization ==
The CIE has six active divisions, each of which establishes technical committees to carry out its program:

- Division 1: Vision and Colour
- Division 2: Physical Measurement of Light and Radiation
- Division 3: Interior Environment and Lighting Design
- Division 4: Transportation and Exterior Applications
- Division 6: Photobiology and Photochemistry
- Division 8: Image Technology

Two divisions are no longer active.

- Division 5: Exterior Lighting and Other Applications
- Division 7: General Aspects of Lighting

The president of the CIE as of 2026 is Jennifer Veitch from Canada.

CIE publishes Technical Reports (TRs), International Standards (ISs) and Technical Notes (TNs). International Standards (ISs) are often further developed as dual standards with the ISO or IEC.

== Milestones ==
A chromaticity plot in three dimensions of the CIELUV color space

- In 1924 it established the standard photopic observer defined by the spectral luminous efficiency function V(λ), followed in 1951 by the standard scotopic observer defined by the function V′(λ).
- Building on the Optical Society of America's report on colorimetry in 1922, the CIE convened its eighth session in 1931, with the intention of establishing an international agreement on colorimetric specifications and updating the OSA's 1922 recommendations based on the developments during the past decade. The meeting, held in Cambridge, United Kingdom, concluded with the formalization of the CIE 1931 XYZ color space & RGB color space and definitions of the 1931 CIE 2° standard observer with the corresponding color matching functions, and standard illuminants A, B, and C.
- In 1964 the 10° CIE standard observer and its corresponding color matching functions as well as the new standard daylight illuminant D6500 were added, as well as a method for calculating daylight illuminants at correlated color temperatures other than 6500 kelvins.
- In 1976, the commission developed the CIELAB and CIELUV color spaces, which are widely used today.
- Based on CIELAB, color difference formulas CIEDE94 and CIEDE2000 were recommended in the corresponding years.

== See also ==
- International Color Consortium (ICC)
- International Colour Association
- International Electrotechnical Commission (IEC)
- International Organization for Standardization (ISO)
