= Colorimetry =

Technique to quantify and describe physically the human color perception

CIE 1931 xy chromaticity diagram

Colorimetry is "the science and technology used to quantify and describe physically the human color perception". It is similar to spectrophotometry, but is distinguished by its interest in reducing spectra to the physical correlates of color perception, most often the CIE 1931 XYZ color space tristimulus values and related quantities.

== History ==
The Duboscq colorimeter was invented by Jules Duboscq in 1870.

== Instruments ==
Colorimetric equipment is similar to that used in spectrophotometry. Some related equipment is also mentioned for completeness.

- A tristimulus colorimeter measures the tristimulus values of a color.
- A spectroradiometer measures the absolute spectral radiance (intensity) or irradiance of a light source.
- A spectrophotometer measures the spectral reflectance, transmittance, or relative irradiance of a color sample.
- A spectrocolorimeter is a spectrophotometer that can calculate tristimulus values.
- A densitometer measures the degree of light passing through or reflected by a subject.
- A color temperature meter measures the color temperature of an incident illuminant.

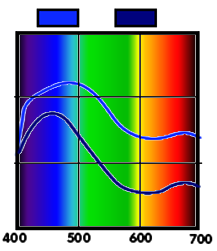
Two spectral reflectance curves. The object in question reflects light with shorter wavelengths while absorbing those in others, lending it a blue appearance.

=== Tristimulus colorimeter ===
In digital imaging, colorimeters are tristimulus devices used for color calibration. Accurate color profiles ensure consistency throughout the imaging workflow, from acquisition to output.

=== Spectroradiometer, spectrophotometer, spectrocolorimeter ===
The absolute spectral power distribution of a light source can be measured with a spectroradiometer, which works by optically collecting the light, then passing it through a monochromator before reading it in narrow bands of wavelength.

Reflected color can be measured using a spectrophotometer (also called spectroreflectometer or reflectometer), which takes measurements in the visible region (and a little beyond) of a given color sample. If the custom of taking readings at 10 nanometer increments is followed, the visible light range of 400–700 nm will yield 31 readings. These readings are typically used to draw the sample's spectral reflectance curve (how much it reflects, as a function of wavelength)—the most accurate data that can be provided regarding its characteristics.

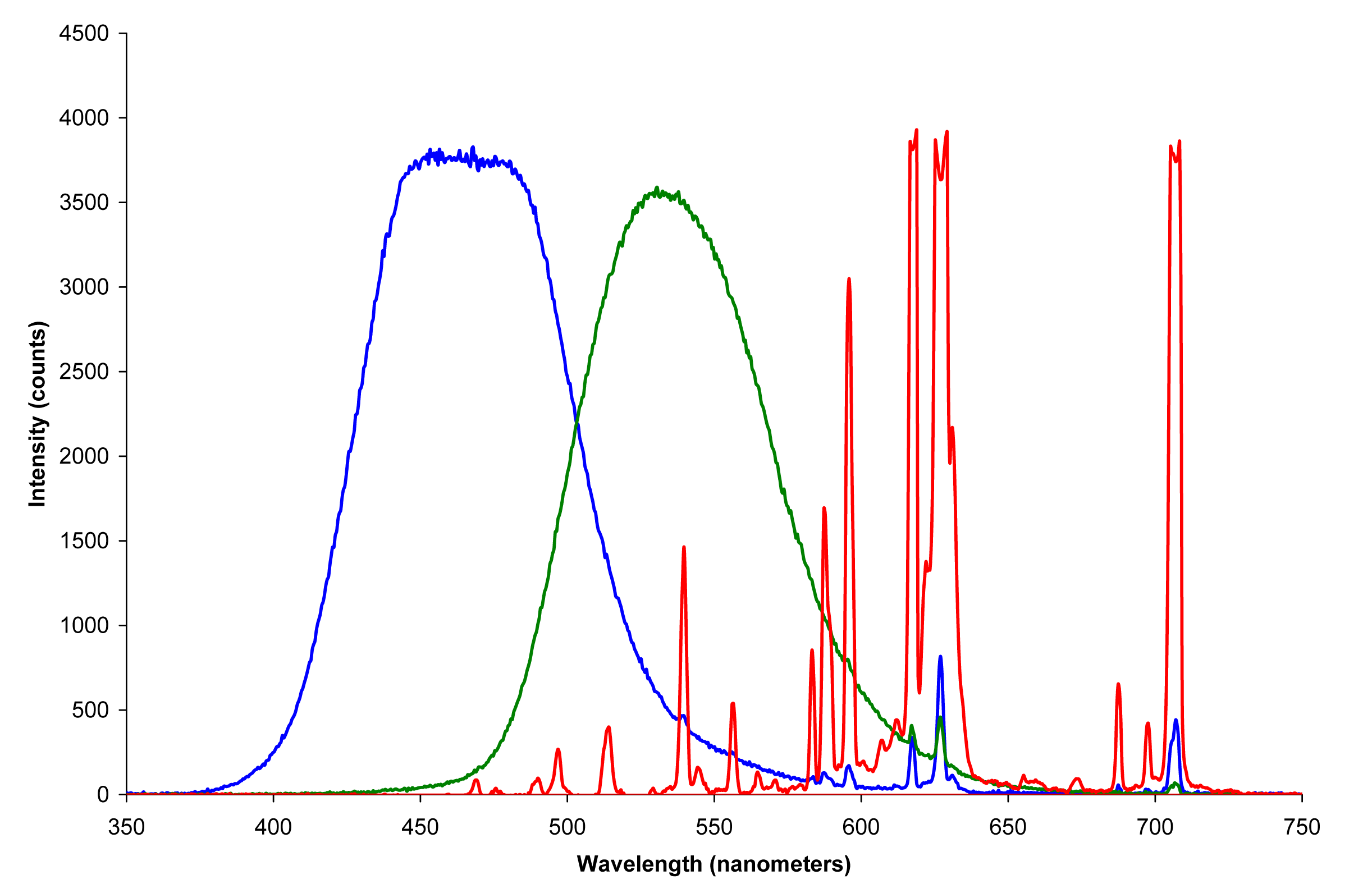
CRT phosphors

The readings by themselves are typically not as useful as their tristimulus values, which can be converted into chromaticity coordinates and manipulated through color space transformations. For this purpose, a spectrocolorimeter may be used. A spectrocolorimeter is simply a spectrophotometer that can estimate tristimulus values by numerical integration (of the color matching functions' inner product with the illuminant's spectral power distribution). One benefit of spectrocolorimeters over tristimulus colorimeters is that they do not have optical filters, which are subject to manufacturing variance, and have a fixed spectral transmittance curve—until they age. On the other hand, tristimulus colorimeters are purpose-built, cheaper, and easier to use.

The CIE (International Commission on Illumination) recommends using measurement intervals under 5 nm, even for smooth spectra. Sparser measurements fail to accurately characterize spiky emission spectra, such as that of the red phosphor of a CRT display, depicted aside.

=== Color temperature meter ===
Photographers and cinematographers use information provided by these meters to decide what color balancing should be done to make different light sources appear to have the same color temperature. If the user enters the reference color temperature, the meter can calculate the mired difference between the measurement and the reference, enabling the user to choose a corrective color gel or photographic filter with the closest mired factor.

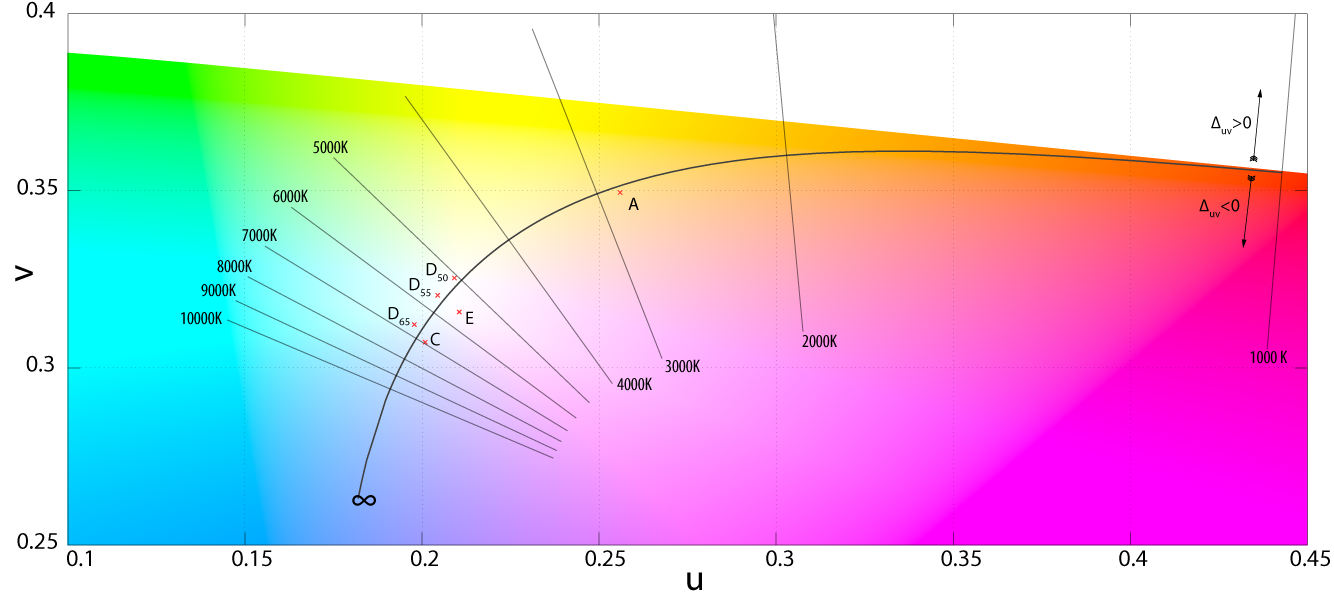
The normals are lines of equal correlated color temperature.

Internally the meter is typically a silicon photodiode tristimulus colorimeter. The correlated color temperature can be calculated from the tristimulus values by first calculating the chromaticity co-ordinates in the CIE 1960 color space, then finding the closest point on the Planckian locus.

== See also ==
- Color science
- Photometry
- Radiometry
