= PTR =

PTR can refer to:

- Pilibhit Tiger Reserve, in India
- Particle transfer roller, for cleaning motion picture film
- Peak-to-trough ratio, a parameter in pharmacokinetics
- Petir LRT station (LRT station abbreviation), Singapore
- PetroChina (NYSE: PTR)
- Photothermal Ratio, light/temperature ratio for a plant
- Physical transmission right in the electricity market
- Physikalisch-Technische Reichsanstalt, later Physikalisch-Technische Bundesanstalt, a German research institute
- Pitrilysin, an enzyme
- Planar ternary ring in algebra
- Pool Test Reactor, Canada
- Proton-transfer-reaction mass spectrometry, used in chemical analysis
- PTR rifle, made by PTR Industries, Inc., US
- A type of DNS record in computer networking
- Pointer in computer programming (e.g. the PTR keyword in x86 assembly language)
- Palanivel Thiagarajan, an Indian politician
- Puerto Rico, ITU country code
- Public Test Realm, a server in Overwatch where updates are tested by developers for player feedback
- PaRappa the Rapper
