= Di-π-methane rearrangement =

Photochemical reaction

In organic chemistry, the di-π-methane rearrangement is the photochemical rearrangement of a molecule that contains two π-systems separated by a saturated carbon atom. In the aliphatic case, this molecules is a 1,4-diene; in the aromatic case, an allyl-substituted arene. The reaction forms (respectively) an ene- or aryl-substituted cyclopropane. Formally, it amounts to a 1,2 shift of one ene group (in the diene) or the aryl group (in the allyl-aromatic analog), followed by bond formation between the lateral carbons of the non-migrating moiety:

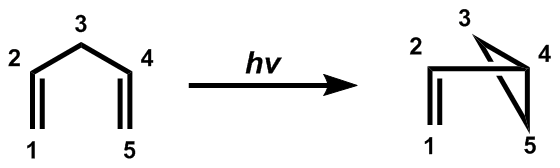
Di-π-methane rearrangement

== Discovery ==
This rearrangement was originally encountered in the photolysis of barrelene to give semibullvalene. Once the mechanism was recognized as general by Howard Zimmerman in 1967, it was clear that the structural requirement was two π groups attached to an sp^{3}-hybridized carbon, and then a variety of further examples were obtained.

== Notable examples ==
Rearrangement of Mariano's diene.

One example was the photolysis of Mariano's compound, 3,3‑dimethyl-1,1,5,5‑tetraphenyl-1,4‑pentadiene. In this symmetric diene, the active π bonds are conjugated to arenes, which does not inhibit the reaction.

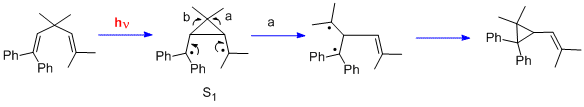
Pratt's diene has two possibilities for rearrangement: a and b. It prefers a, because the intermediate diradical is conjugated to the phenyl substituents.

Another was the asymmetric Pratt diene. Pratt's diene demonstrates that the reaction preferentially cyclopropanates aryl substituents, because the reaction pathway preserves the resonant stabilization of a benzhydrylic radical intermediate.

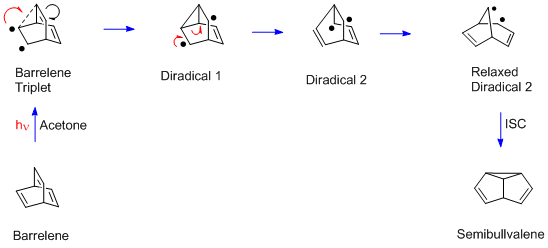
The barrelene to semibullvalene transformation. ISC is an intersystem crossing.

The barrelene rearrangement is more complex than the Mariano and Pratt examples since there are two sp^{3}-hybridized carbons. Each bridgehead carbon has three (ethylenic) π bonds, and any two can undergo the di‑π-methane rearrangement. Moreover, unlike the acyclic Mariano and Pratt dienes, the barrelene reaction requires a triplet excited state. Thus acetone is used in the barrelene reaction; acetone captures the light and then delivers triplet excitation to the barrelene reactant. In the final step of the rearrangement there is a spin flip, to provide paired electrons and a new σ bond.

== As excited-state probe ==
The dependence of the di-π-methane rearrangement on the multiplicity of the excited state arises from the free-rotor effect. Triplet 1,4-dienes freely undergo cis-trans interconversion of diene double bonds (i.e. free rotation). In acyclic dienes, this free rotation leads to diradical reconnection, short-circuiting the di-π-methane process. Singlet excited states do not rotate and may thus undergo the di-π-methane mechanism. For cyclic dienes, as in the barrelene example, the ring structure can prevent free-rotatory dissipation, and may in fact require bond rotation to complete the rearrangement.
