= Photothermal ratio =

The photothermal ratio (PTR), also named photothermal quotient, is a variable that characterizes the amount of light available to plants relative to the temperature level. It is used in plant biology to characterize the growth environment of plants.

== Rationale ==
Both light and temperature are important environmental variables that determine the growth and development of plants. Light is especially important in driving photosynthesis and producing sugars. Temperature is a strong driver of cell division, where available sugars are converted to produce new leaf, stem, root or reproductive biomass. As such, both are important factors – along with nutrient and water availability – in determining the source:sink balance of a plant, the amount of sugar available for the plant in relation to its growth potential. The photothermal ratio is a quantitative descriptor that can be used to approximate this balance.

== Calculation and units ==
The photothermal ratio is calculated by dividing the Daily Light Integral (photosynthetic photon flux density integrated over a day; DLI) plants are exposed to by a baseline daily temperature(T_{b}). PTR = DLI / T_{b}. Units are therefore mol quanta m^{−2} day^{−1} °C^{−1}. Alternatively, the number of degree days have been used rather than T_{b} per se, with units of the form mol degree-day^{−1}. The PTR concept has been introduced in detailed studies of growth and productivity of a particular species. For these species, a baseline temperature T_{b} is chosen for which it is known than no leaf elongation takes place below that temperature, which for many temperate species will be a temperature around 5 °C.

In characterizing the growth environment of a broad range of plants without reference to any specific species, T_{b} has been taken to be zero °C.

== Normal ranges ==
The photothermal ratio is relatively constant over the year in the tropics, with lowland values around 1.3 mol m^{−2} day^{−1} °C^{−1}. At higher latitudes PTR changes with seasons, being high in spring, and low in autumn. Averaged over the growing season, PTR values are around 3 in boreal zones, and around 2 in temperate zones. Plants growing in glasshouses often grow at a PTR of ~1, experiments with Arabidopsis are often carried out at a PTR around 0.2.

== Effects on plants ==
Many effects that have been ascribed to light are actually dependent on temperature as well. For example, strong stem elongation at low light will only take place when temperatures are high, but not when temperatures are close to 0 °C. In wheat, PTR in the month before anthesis strongly determines the number of kernels. In horticulture, plants grown at a high PTR generally have thicker stems, shorter internodes and more flowers, and therefore have higher marketable yield.

== See also ==
- Daily light integral
- Climate
