= Construction costs =

Construction costs may refer to:

- Costs associated with construction work
- Construction costs (biology), a concept in biology relating to the amount of glucose required to construct a unit of plant biomass.
