= Construction costs (biology) =

Construction costs is a concept in biology that conveys how much glucose is required to construct a unit of plant biomass, given the biosynthetic pathways and starting from glucose and mineral constituents. It includes the sugars required to provide the carbon skeletons for the formation of e.g. lipids, lignin and proteins, but also the glucose required to produce energy (ATP) and reducing power (NAD(P)H) to drive the metabolic pathways.

== Rationale ==
The concept of construction costs comes from microbiology, when studying the different metabolic pathways that heterotrophic microorganisms use for producing biomass. It has subsequently been used by plant biologists to calculate how much glucose would be required to build leaves, stems and roots. The metabolic costs to maintain cells or organs are generally not included in these estimates.

Plant ecologists have also calculated the payback time of leaves, the time required for a leaf to fix as much carbon as it cost to construct the leaf. For plants to be successful, payback time must be shorter than average leaf longevity, otherwise the plant has a negative carbon balance and is losing out on its investments. However, leaves can only function with stems that help expose leaves to the light, and roots that take up the necessary nutrients and water, so the concept of payback time can also be applied to whole plants. Payback time then approaches the doubling time of biomass, or, in other words, the relative growth rate of plants.

== Units and measurements ==
The unit of construction costs is g g^{−1} (g glucose required / g biomass produced). Theoretically, if the biochemical pathways to construct all of the thousands of different compounds of an organism would be known, as well as the concentrations of all those compounds, construction costs could be simply calculated as the product of concentration and construction costs, summed over all constituents present. However, as there are so many different compounds, this is not really feasible. Alternatively, chemical constituents can be grouped in a number of groups with relatively similar construction costs per unit compound. These groups and their estimated construction costs are given in the table below. Using approaches to determine the concentrations of these groups of compounds then enables calculation of plant organs construction costs. The construction costs given in the table are strongly related to the oxidation state of these compounds. That is: highest construction costs are for highly reduced compounds like lipids and lignin, lowest for highly oxidized organic compounds such as organic acids, and for the minerals. This is the basis for short-cut methods that estimate construction costs on the basis of elemental composition or energy content. They may be less precise, but do not require extended measurements of the proximate chemical composition. Consequence of using shortcut methods is that less insight is obtained as to the underlying reasons why construction costs differ between organisms.

Compound	Construction costs (g g^{−1})
Lipids	3.03
Soluble phenolics	2.60
Protein (with NO3)	2.48
Lignin	2.12
Total Structural Carbohydrates (TSC)	1.22
Total Non-structural Carbohydrates (TNC)	1.09
Organic acids	0.91
Minerals	0

== Normal values ==
Generally, construction costs of leaves are in the order of 1.3 – 1.7 g g^{−1}, with slightly lower values for stems and roots. The reason for this is that across most vegetative plant tissue there is a strong negative correlation between the level of – expensive - protein and the level of – expensive- lignin, and a strong positive correlation between protein and the concentration of – cheap - minerals. Seeds and fruits may have very high concentrations of sugars, or of protein, and/or lipids, and therefore show a much wider range in construction costs (1.1 - 2.3 g g^{−1}).

Payback time of leaves vary from a few days for fast-growing herbaceous species under optimal conditions, to three months or more for plants growing in low-light environments.

== Environmental effects ==
Although concentrations of chemical constituents change with the environment, the effects on leaf chemical composition are general small. Leaves of plants grown at elevated CO_{2} may have a few percent higher construction costs, as do leaves that have been growing at higher light intensities.

== Functional groups ==
Differences in leaf construction costs between deciduous and evergreen species are small, and so are the differences between inherently fast- and slow-growing herbaceous species.
