= Grow light =

Lighting to aid plant growth

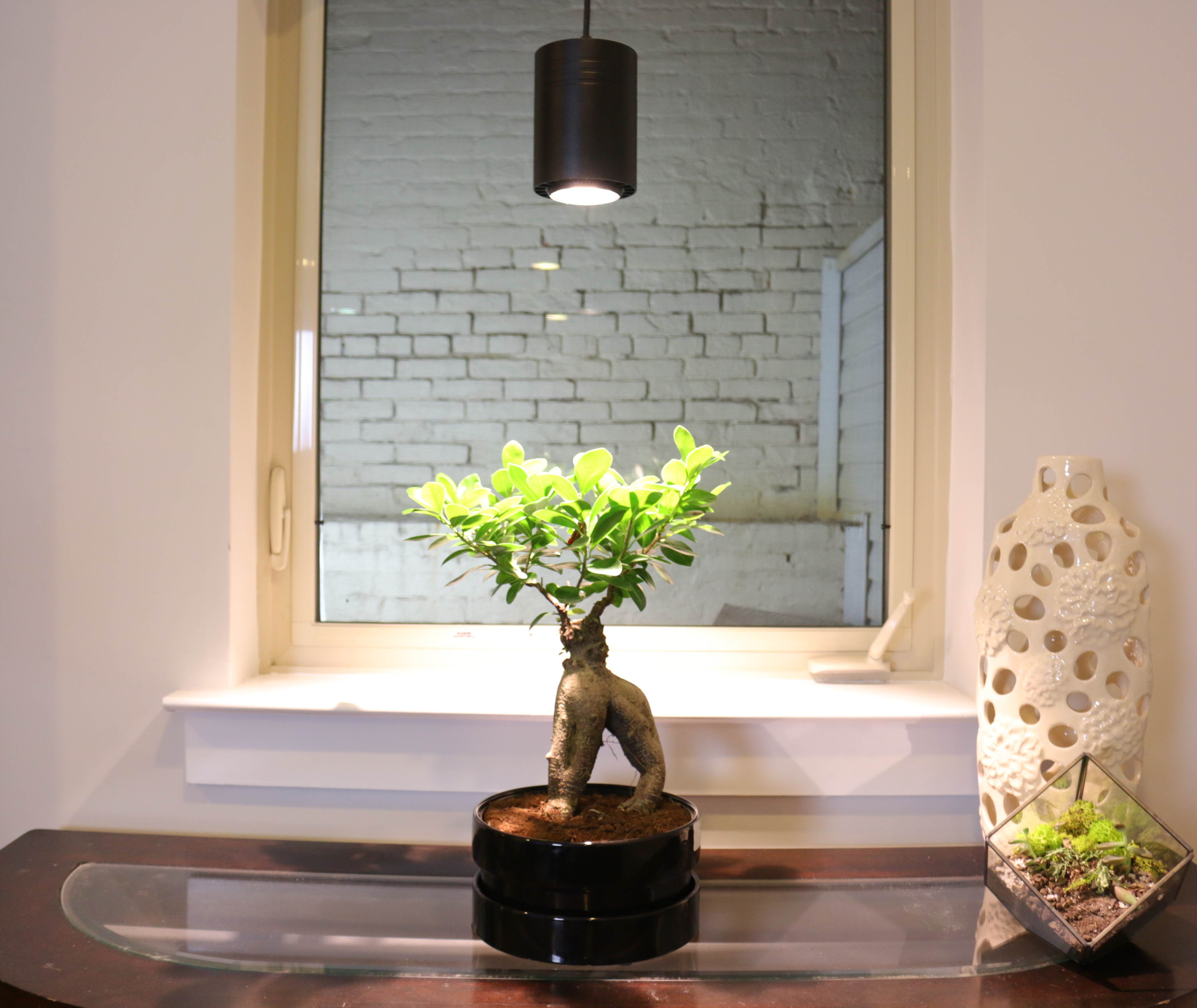
Ficus plant grown under a white LED grow light

A grow light is an electric light that can help plants grow. Grow lights either attempt to provide a light spectrum similar to that of the sun, or to provide a spectrum that is more tailored to the needs of the plants being cultivated (typically a varying combination of red and blue light, which generally appears pink to purple to the human eye). Outdoor conditions are mimicked with varying colour temperatures and spectral outputs from the grow light, as well as varying the intensity of the lamps. Depending on the type of plant being cultivated, the stage of cultivation (e.g. the germination/vegetative phase or the flowering/fruiting phase), and the photoperiod required by the plants, specific ranges of spectrum, luminous efficacy and color temperature are desirable for use with specific plants and time periods.

== Typical use ==
Grow lights are used for horticulture, indoor gardening, plant propagation and food production, including indoor hydroponics and aquatic plants. Although most grow lights are used on an industrial level, they can also be used in households.

According to the inverse-square law, the intensity of light radiating from a point source (in this case a bulb) that reaches a surface is inversely proportional to the square of the surface's distance from the source (if an object is twice as far away, it receives only a quarter the light) which is a serious hurdle for indoor growers, and many techniques are employed to use light as efficiently as possible. Reflectors are thus often used in the lights to maximize light efficiency. Plants or lights are moved as close together as possible so that they receive equal lighting and that all light coming from the lights falls on the plants rather than on the surrounding area.

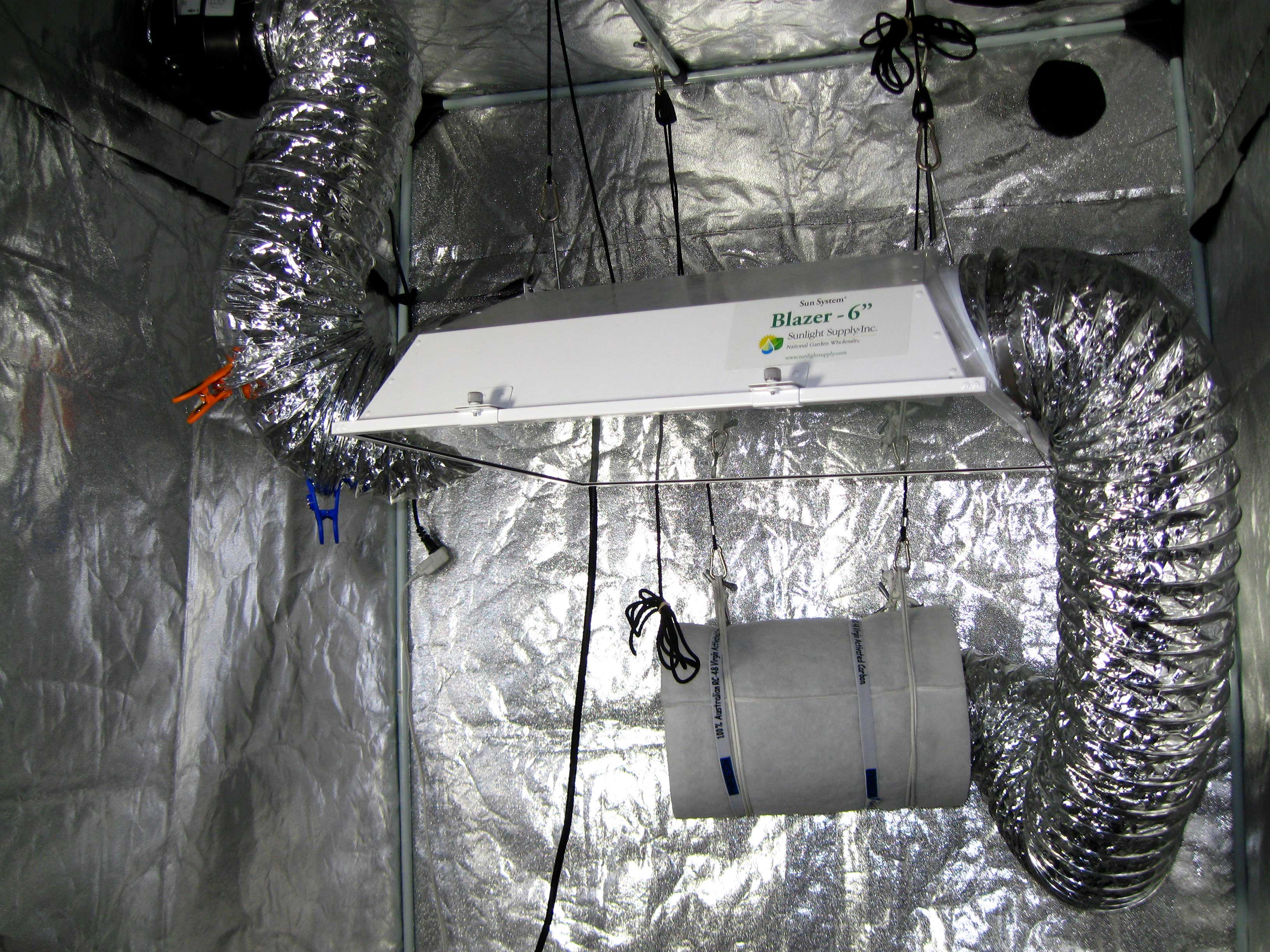
Example of an HPS grow light set up in a grow tent. The setup includes a carbon filter to remove odors, and ducting to exhaust hot air using a powerful exhaust fan.

A range of bulb types can be used as grow lights, such as incandescents, fluorescent lights, high-intensity discharge lamps (HID), and light-emitting diodes (LED). Today, the most widely used lights for professional use are HIDs and fluorescents. Indoor flower and vegetable growers typically use high-pressure sodium (HPS/SON) and metal halide (MH) HID lights, but fluorescents and LEDs are replacing metal halides due to their efficiency and economy.

Metal halide lights are regularly used for the vegetative phase of plant growth, as they emit larger amounts of blue and ultraviolet radiation. With the introduction of ceramic metal halide lighting and full-spectrum metal halide lighting, they are increasingly being utilized as an exclusive source of light for both vegetative and reproductive growth stages. Blue spectrum light may trigger a greater vegetative response in plants.

High-pressure sodium lights are also used as a single source of light throughout the vegetative and reproductive stages. As well, they may be used as an amendment to full-spectrum lighting during the reproductive stage. Red spectrum light may trigger a greater flowering response in plants. If high-pressure sodium lights are used for the vegetative phase, plants grow slightly more quickly, but will have longer internodes, and may be longer overall.

In recent years LED technology has been introduced into the grow light market. By designing an indoor grow light using diodes, specific wavelengths of light can be produced. NASA has tested LED grow lights for their high efficiency in growing food in space for extraterrestrial colonization. Findings showed that plants are affected by light in the red, green and blue parts of the visible light spectrum.

== Common types by generation ==
=== Fourth generation: Light-emitting diodes (LEDs) ===
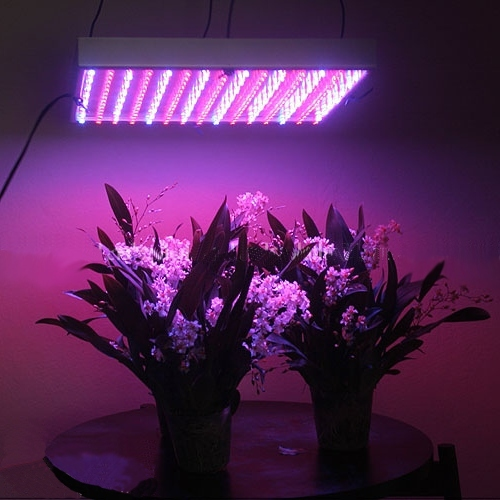
Two plants growing under a magenta (red + blue) LED grow light

LED light is regarded as the fourth generation of light sources. LED lights produce the highest photosynthetically active radiation (PAR) of any light.

LED grow lights are usually composed of multiple individual light-emitting diodes in a casing with a heat sink and built-in fans. Most or all LEDs use AC/DC or DC/DC power supplies that provide constant direct current through the LEDs, regulating the amount of total power the LEDs can draw and preventing their failure.

Individual LEDs usually provide only a single narrow range of colors, and so different color LEDs are mixed in grow lights in proportions depending on the intended use. It is known from the study of photomorphogenesis that green, red, far-red and blue light spectra each have an effect on root formation, plant growth, and flowering, but there are not enough scientific studies or field-tested trials using LED grow lights to recommend specific color ratios for optimal plant growth under LED grow lights. It has been shown that many plants can grow normally if given both red and blue light. However, many studies indicate that red and blue light (pink to purple depending on the red to blue ratio) only provides the most cost efficient method of growth, plant growth is still better under light supplemented with green.

White LED grow lights provide a full spectrum of light designed to mimic natural light, providing plants a spectrum of red, blue and green. White light is rated on a spectrum in terms of color temperature where cooler lights produce more blue photons and warmer lights produce more red photons.

A large number of plant species have been assessed in greenhouse trials to make sure plants have higher quality in biomass and biochemical ingredients even higher or comparable with field conditions. Plant performance of mint, basil, lentil, lettuce, cabbage, parsley, and carrot were measured by assessing health and vigor of plants and success in promoting growth. Promotion of profuse flowering in select ornamentals including primula, marigold, and stock were also noticed.

In tests conducted by Philips Lighting to find an optimal light recipe for growing various vegetables in greenhouses, it was found that the following aspects of light affect both plant growth (photosynthesis) and plant development (morphology): light intensity, total light over time, light at which moment of the day, light/dark period per day, light quality (spectrum), light direction and light distribution over the plants. However it's noted that in tests between tomatoes, mini cucumbers and bell peppers, the optimal light recipe was not the same for all plants, and varied depending on both the crop and the region, so currently they must optimize LED lighting in greenhouses based on trial and error. They've shown that LED light affects disease resistance, taste and nutritional levels, but as of 2014 they haven't found a practical way to use that information.

The diodes used in initial LED grow light designs were usually 1/3 watt to 1 watt in power. However, higher wattage diodes such as 3 watt and 5 watt diodes are now commonly used in LED grow lights. For highly compacted areas, COB chips between 10 watts and 100 watts can be used. Because of heat dissipation, these chips are often less efficient. Standard LED lighting usually has a power factor of at least 0.90, while good quality LED lights will be around 0.99.

To prevent leaf burn, LED grow lights should be kept between 12 inches (30 cm) away from plants for lower wattage lamps (under 300 watts) up to 36 inches (91 cm) away from plants for higher wattage lamps (1000 watts or more).

Historically, LED lighting was very expensive, but costs have greatly reduced over time, and their longevity has made them more popular. LED grow lights are often priced higher, watt-for-watt, than other LED lighting, due to design features that help them to be more energy efficient and last longer. In particular, because LED grow lights are relatively high power, LED grow lights are often equipped with cooling systems, as low temperature improves both the brightness and longevity. LEDs usually last for 10,000 – 50,000 hours until LM-70 is reached.

=== Third generation: High-intensity discharge (HID) lamps ===
High-intensity discharge lamp is regarded as the third generation of light sources.

Fluorescent lighting was formerly the most common type of indoor grow light but HID lights have surpassed them. High-intensity discharge lamps have a high lumen-per-watt efficiency. There are several different types of HID lights including mercury vapor, metal halide, high-pressure sodium and conversion bulbs. Metal halide and HPS lamps produce a color spectrum that is somewhat comparable to the sun and can be used to grow plants. Mercury vapor lamps were the first type of HIDs and were widely used for street lighting, but when it comes to indoor gardening they produce a relatively poor spectrum for plant growth so they have been mostly replaced by other types of HIDs for growing plants.

All HID grow lights require an electrical ballast to operate, and each ballast has a particular power rating. Popular HID ratings include 150W, 250W, 400W, 600W and 1000W. 600W HID lights are the most electrically efficient as far as light produced, followed by 1000W. A 600W HPS produces 7% more light (lumen-per-watt) than a 1000W HPS.

Although all HID lamps work on the same principle, the different types of bulbs have different starting and voltage requirements, as well as different operating characteristics and physical shape. Because of this a bulb won't work properly without a matching ballast, even if the bulb will physically screw in. In addition to producing lower levels of light, mismatched bulbs and ballasts will stop working early, or may even burn out immediately.

==== Metal halide (MH) ====
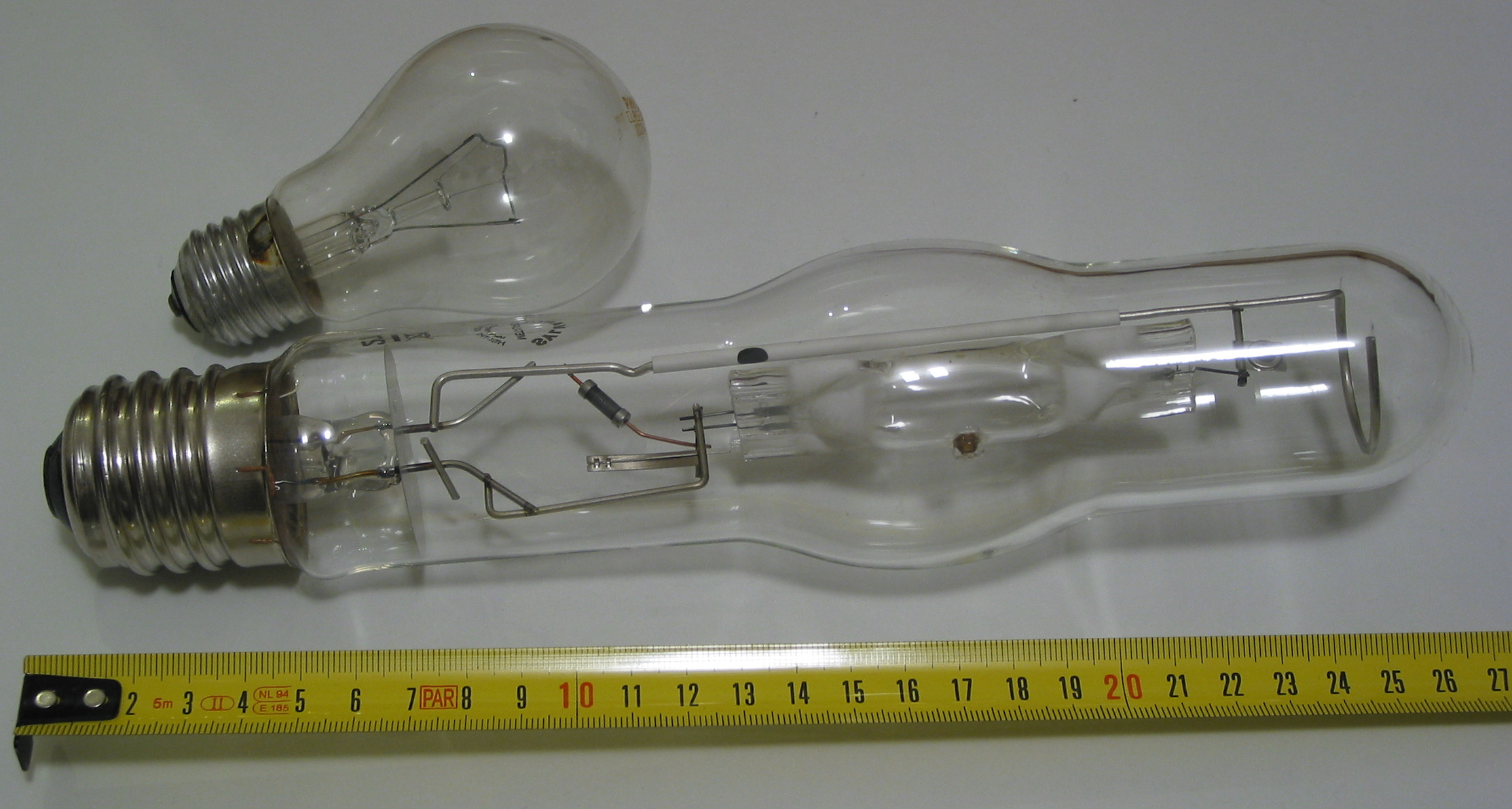
400W Metal halide bulb compared to smaller incandescent bulb

Metal halide bulbs are a type of HID light that emit light in the blue and violet parts of the light spectrum, which is similar to the light that is available outdoors during spring. Because their light mimics the color spectrum of the sun, some growers find that plants look more pleasing under a metal halide than other types of HID lights such as the HPS which distort the color of plants. Therefore, it's more common for a metal halide to be used when the plants are on display in the home (for example with ornamental plants) and natural color is preferred. Metal halide bulbs need to be replaced about once a year, compared to HPS lights which last twice as long.

Metal halide lamps are widely used in the horticultural industry and are well-suited to supporting plants in earlier developmental stages by promoting stronger roots, better resistance against disease and more compact growth. The blue spectrum of light encourages compact, leafy growth and may be better suited to growing vegetative plants with much foliage.

A metal halide bulb produces 60–125 lumens/watt, depending on the wattage of the bulb.

They are now being made for digital ballasts in a pulse start version, which have higher electrical efficiency (up to 110 lumens per watt) and faster warmup. One common example of a pulse start metal halide is the ceramic metal halide (CMH). Pulse start metal halide bulbs can come in any desired spectrum from cool white (7000 K) to warm white (3000 K) and even ultraviolet-heavy (10,000 K).

==== Ceramic metal halide (CMH) ====
Ceramic metal halide (CMH) lamps are a relatively new type of HID lighting, and the technology is referred to by a few names when it comes to grow lights, including ceramic discharge metal halide (CDM), ceramic arc metal halide.

Ceramic metal halide lights are started with a pulse-starter, just like other "pulse-start" metal halides. The discharge of a ceramic metal halide bulb is contained in a type of ceramic material known as polycrystalline alumina (PCA), which is similar to the material used for an HPS. PCA reduces sodium loss, which in turn reduces color shift and variation compared to standard MH bulbs. Horticultural ceramic metal halide offerings from companies such as Philips have proven to be effective sources of growth light for medium-wattage applications.

==== Combination MH and HPS ("Dual arc") ====
Combination HPS/MH lights combine a metal halide and a high-pressure sodium in the same bulb, providing both red and blue spectrums in a single HID lamp. The combination of blue metal halide light and red high-pressure sodium light is an attempt to provide a very wide spectrum within a single lamp. This allows for a single bulb solution throughout the entire life cycle of the plant, from vegetative growth through flowering. There are potential tradeoffs for the convenience of a single bulb in terms of yield. There are however some qualitative benefits that come for the wider light spectrum.

==== High-pressure sodium (HPS) ====
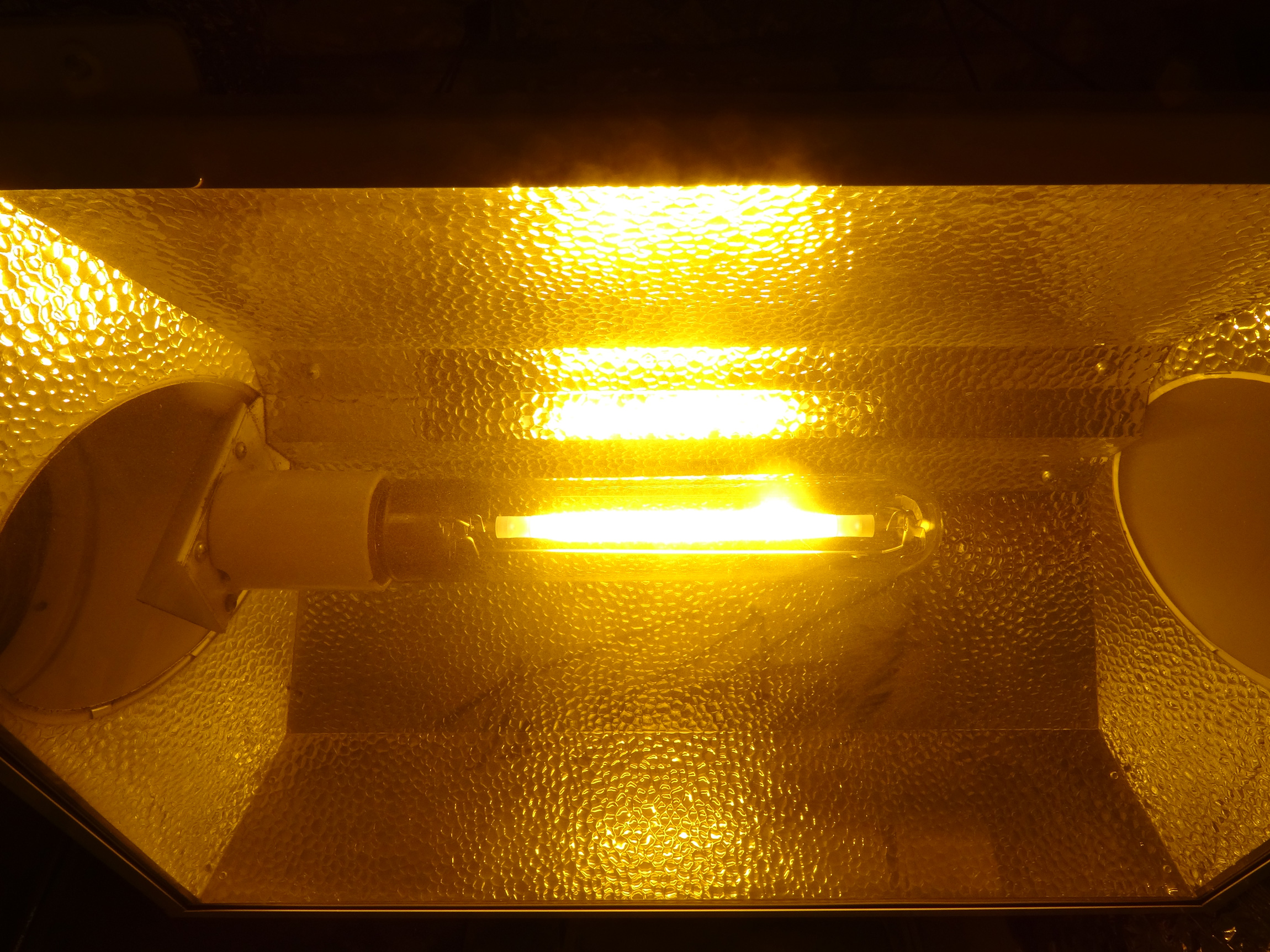
An HPS (High-Pressure Sodium) grow light bulb in an air-cooled reflector with hammer finish. The yellowish light is the signature color produced by an HPS.

High-pressure sodium lights are a more efficient type of HID lighting than metal halides. HPS bulbs emit light in the yellow/red visible light as well as small portions of all other visible light. Since HPS grow lights deliver more energy in the red part of the light spectrum, they may promote blooming and fruiting. They are used as a supplement to natural daylight in greenhouse lighting and metal halide or, as a standalone source of light for indoors/grow chambers.

HPS grow lights are sold in the following sizes: 150W, 250W, 400W, 600W and 1000W. Of all the sizes, 600W HID lights are the most electrically efficient as far as light produced, followed by 1000W. A 600W HPS produces 7% more light (watt-for-watt) than a 1000W HPS.

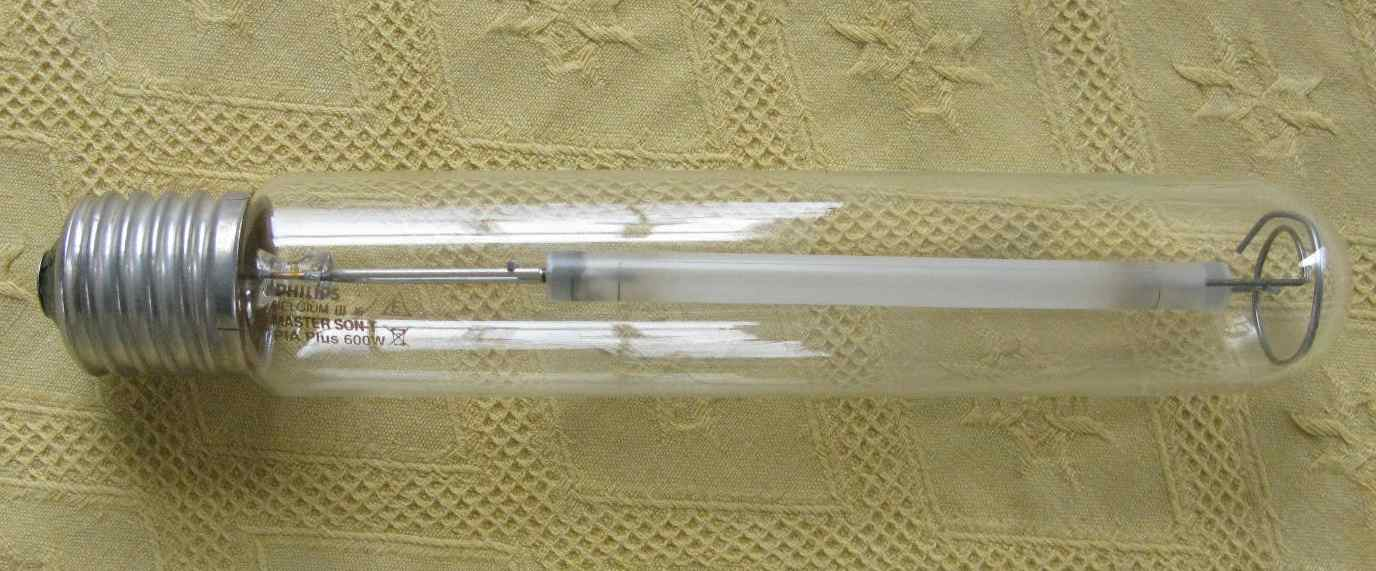
A 600W High-Pressure Sodium bulb

An HPS bulb produces 60–140 lumens/watt, depending on the wattage of the bulb.

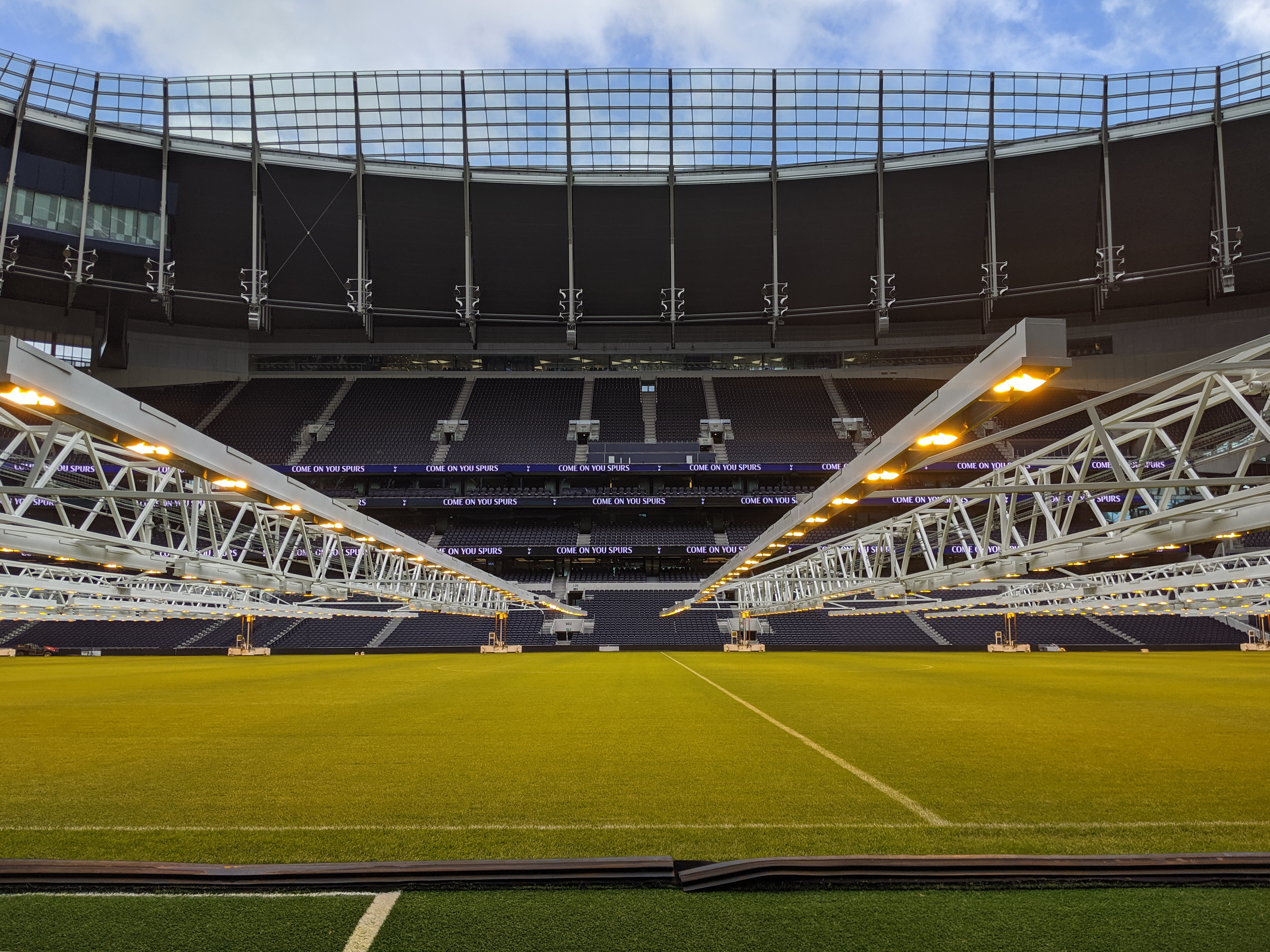
HPS grow lights suspended over the grass pitch at Tottenham Hotspur Stadium to encourage grass growth

Plants grown under HPS lights tend to elongate from the lack of blue/ultraviolet radiation. Modern horticultural HPS lamps have a much better adjusted spectrum for plant growth. The majority of HPS lamps promote decent growth, but typically have very poor color rendering index (CRI). This can distort colours, making it more difficult to monitor plant health. CRI isn't an issue when HPS lamps are used as supplemental lighting in greenhouses which make use of natural daylight (which offsets the yellow light of the HPS).

High-pressure sodium lights have a long usable bulb life, and six times more light output per watt of energy consumed than a standard incandescent grow light. Due to their high efficiency and the fact that plants grown in greenhouses get all the blue light they need naturally, these lights are the preferred supplemental greenhouse lights. But, in the higher latitudes, there are periods of the year where sunlight is scarce, and additional sources of light are indicated for proper growth. HPS lights may cause distinctive infrared and optical signatures, which can attract insects or other species of pests; these may in turn threaten the plants being grown. High-pressure sodium lights emit a lot of heat, which can cause leggier growth, although this can be controlled by using special air-cooled bulb reflectors or enclosures.

==== Conversion bulbs ====
Conversion bulbs are manufactured so they work with either a MH or HPS ballast. A grower can run an HPS conversion bulb on a MH ballast, or a MH conversion bulb on a HPS ballast. The difference between the ballasts is an HPS ballast has an igniter which ignites the sodium in an HPS bulb, while a MH ballast does not. Because of this, all electrical ballasts can fire MH bulbs, but only a Switchable or HPS ballast can fire an HPS bulb without a conversion bulb. Usually a metal halide conversion bulb will be used in an HPS ballast since the MH conversion bulbs are more common.

==== Switchable ballasts ====
A switchable ballast is an HID ballast that can be used with either a metal halide or an HPS bulb of equivalent wattage. So a 600W Switchable ballast would work with either a 600W MH or HPS. Growers use these fixtures for propagating and vegetatively growing plants under the metal halide, then switching to a high-pressure sodium bulb for the fruiting or flowering stage of plant growth. To change between the lights, only the bulb needs changing and a switch needs to be set to the appropriate setting.

=== Second generation: Fluorescent ===
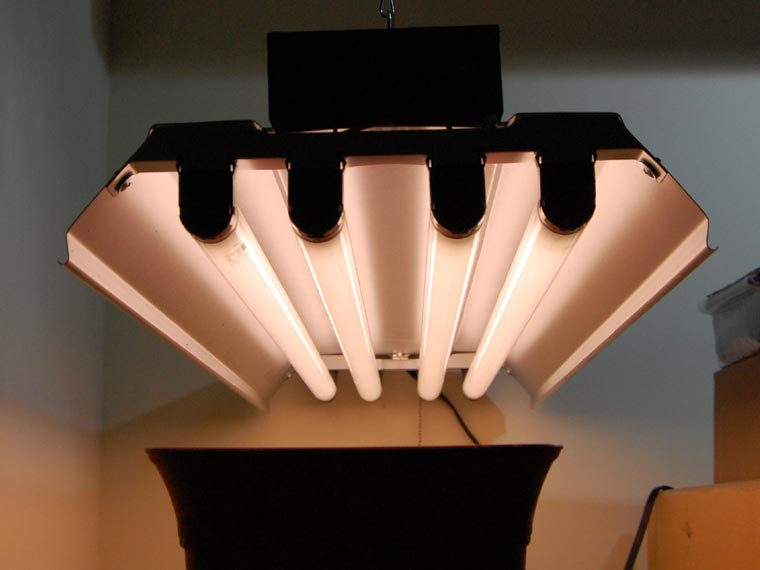
Fluorescent grow light

Fluorescent lamp is regarded as the second generation of light sources.

Fluorescent lights come in many form factors, including long, thin bulbs as well as smaller spiral shaped bulbs (compact fluorescent lights). Fluorescent lights are available in color temperatures ranging from 2700 K to 10,000 K. The luminous efficacy ranges from 30 lm/W to 90 lm/W. The two main types of fluorescent lights used for growing plants are the tube-style lights and compact fluorescent lights.

==== Tube-style fluorescent lights ====
Fluorescent grow lights are not as intense as HID lights and are usually used for growing vegetables and herbs indoors, or for starting seedlings to get a jump start on spring plantings. A ballast is needed to run these types of fluorescent lights.

Standard fluorescent lighting comes in multiple form factors, including the T5, T8 and T12. The brightest version is the T5. The T8 and T12 are less powerful and are more suited to plants with lower light needs. High-output fluorescent lights produce twice as much light as standard fluorescent lights. A high-output fluorescent fixture has a very thin profile, making it useful in vertically limited areas.

Fluorescents have an average usable life span of up to 20,000 hours. A fluorescent grow light produces 33–100 lumens/watt, depending on the form factor and wattage.

==== Compact fluorescent lights (CFLs) ====
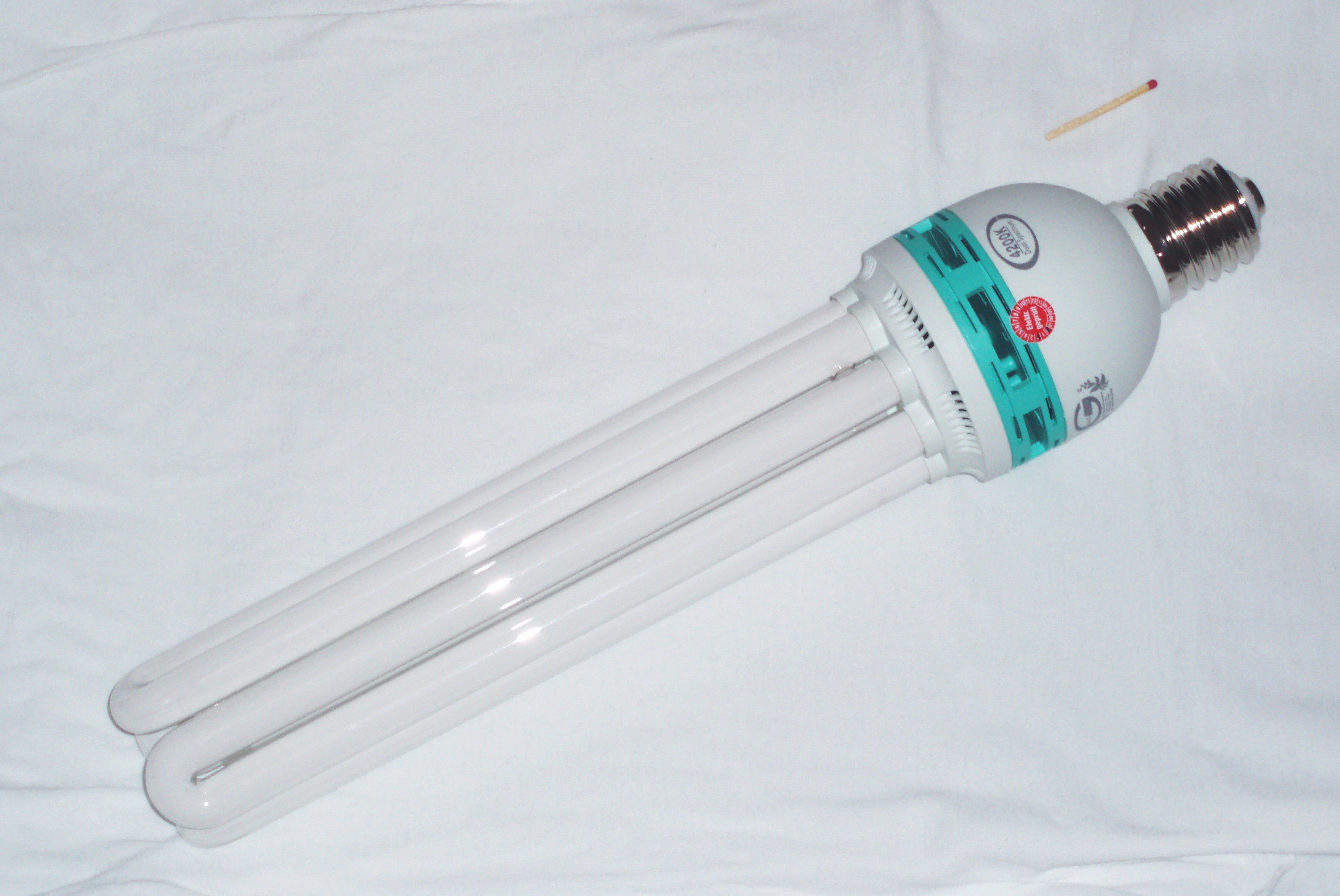
Dual spectrum compact fluorescent grow light. Actual length is about 40 cm (16 in)

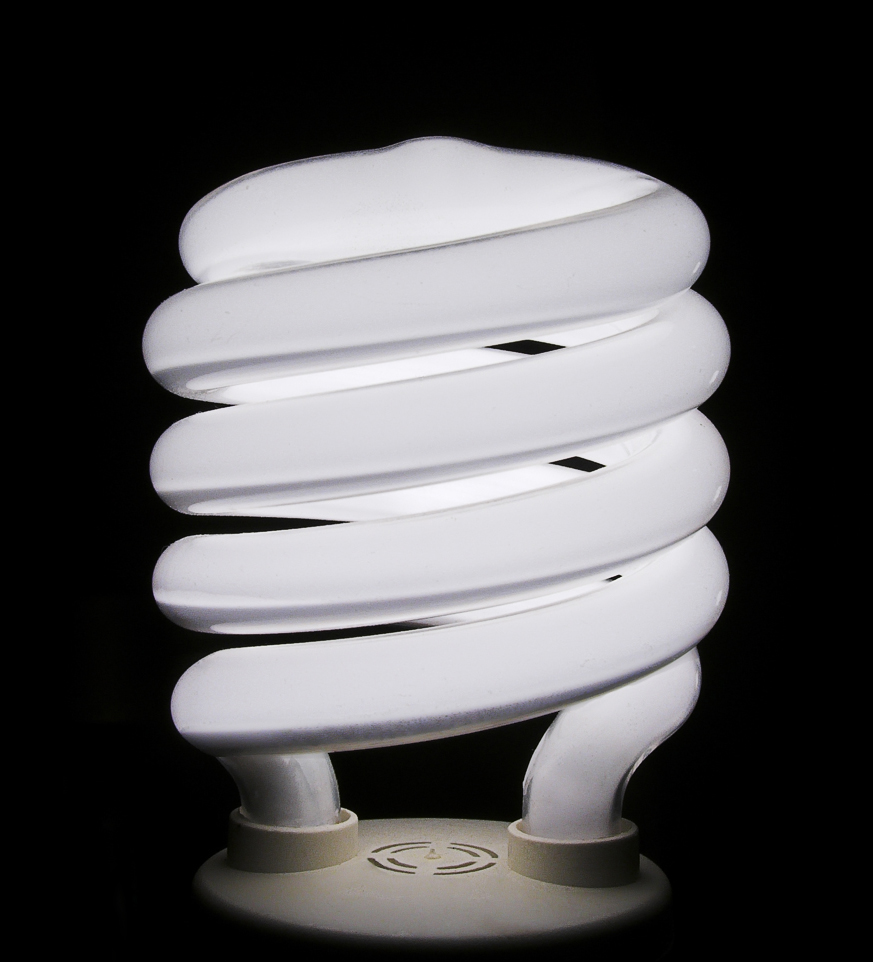
Standard Compact Fluorescent Light

Compact Fluorescent lights (CFLs) are smaller versions of fluorescent lights that were originally designed as pre-heat lamps, but are now available in rapid-start form. CFLs have largely replaced incandescent light bulbs in households because they last longer and are much more electrically efficient. In some cases, CFLs are also used as grow lights. Like standard fluorescent lights, they are useful for propagation and situations where relatively low light levels are needed.

While standard CFLs in small sizes can be used to grow plants, there are also now CFL lamps made specifically for growing plants. Often these larger compact fluorescent bulbs are sold with specially designed reflectors that direct light to plants, much like HID lights. Common CFL grow lamp sizes include 125W, 200W, 250W and 300W.

Unlike HID lights, CFLs fit in a standard mogul light socket and don't need a separate ballast.

Compact fluorescent bulbs are available in warm/red (2700 K), full spectrum or daylight (5000 K) and cool/blue (6500 K) versions. Warm red spectrum is recommended for flowering, and cool blue spectrum is recommended for vegetative growth.

Usable life span for compact fluorescent grow lights is about 10,000 hours. A CFL produces 44–80 lumens/watt, depending on the wattage of the bulb.

Examples of lumens and lumens/watt for different size CFLs:

CFL Wattage	Initial Lumens	Lumens/watt
23W	1,600	70
42W	2,800	67
85W	4,250	50
125W	7,000	56
200W	10,000	50

==== Cold-cathode fluorescent light (CCFL) ====
A cold cathode is a cathode that is not electrically heated by a filament. A cathode may be considered "cold" if it emits more electrons than can be supplied by thermionic emission alone. It is used in gas-discharge lamps, such as neon lamps, discharge tubes, and some types of vacuum tube. The other type of cathode is a hot cathode, which is heated by electric current passing through a filament. A cold cathode does not necessarily operate at a low temperature: it is often heated to its operating temperature by other methods, such as the current passing from the cathode into the gas.

=== First generation: Incandescent light bulbs ===
Incandescent light bulb is regarded as the first generation of light sources.

== Light requirements of plants ==
The quantity, quality, and duration of light regulate plant growth and development. In general, if a plant does not get enough light, it will become stunted, have reduced pigmentation, or begin shade-avoidance response. A plant that does not receive the right quality of light may exhibit physiological differences when compared to the same plants grown under optimal lighting conditions.

Grow light quantity and quality has been technologically limited in the past. High-pressure sodium (HPS) and metal halide (MH) were and are still common supplemental lighting options for greenhouses and some sole-source operations. Older LED grow lights composed solely of blue and red LEDs due to both their efficiency at converting electricity to photons and efficiency at driving photosynthesis. As LEDs become less expensive and more efficient, an interest in studying light quality has risen in the field of plant science.

=== Light Quantity ===
Light quantity refers to the amount of light a plant requires each day for optimal growth. Historically, light quantity was expressed in units of W m^{−2}, lumens, or lux. While these units are useful in energy calculations, W m^{−2}, or in human lighting (lumens and lux), plant scientists now prefer to measure the photosynthetic photon flux density (PPFD), in units of μmol m^{−2}s^{−1}. PPFD is an explicit measure of the quantity of photons hitting a surface per square meter per second, a more accurate way to measure how plants interact with photons.

Another useful way to measure light quantity is through the daily light integral, or DLI. The DLI takes into account the PPFD and the total number of hours a plant is exposed to that PPFD to get the total quantity of photons per day, in units of mol m^{−2}d^{−1}. The equation for converting PPFD to DLI, assuming constant PPFD, is below.

DLI (mol m^{−2}d^{−1}) =0.0036 * PPFD (μmol m^{−2}s^{−1}) *Hours of Light

The light quantity requirements for crops vary, in general the light requirement for a specific crop is greater for crops that are fruiting and flowering and is less for crops that remain vegetative. Leafy greens such as lettuce, spinach, and kale are typically considered low-light crops, requiring a DLI between 12 and 17 mol m^{−2}d^{−1}. Tomatoes, cucumbers, and peppers require between 20–30 mol m^{−2}d^{−1}. Cannabis has one of the highest light requirements of cultivated plants, requiring a DLI of up to 40 mol m^{−2}d^{−1}.

=== Light quality ===
Absorbance spectra of free chlorophyll a (blue) and b (red) in a solvent. The action spectra of chlorophyll molecules are slightly modified in vivo depending on specific pigment-protein interactions.

Light quality refers to the spectral distribution of light given to a plant. Light quality is grouped into colors based on wavelength; 320–400 nanometers (nm) is UVA, 400–500 nm is blue, 500–600 nm is green, 600–700 nm is red, and 700–750 nm is far red, sometimes referred to as near-infrared. Light quality can also be expressed as ratios, e.g. 3:2 red:blue ratio, or sometimes as their peak irradiance, e.g. 450 nm blue light and 660 nm red light. Photomorphogenesis is the term for light-mediated plant responses to light spectrum. Plants are able to sense parts of the electromagnetic spectrum through a network of photoreceptors including phytochromes, cryptochromes, phototropin, and zeiltupe. Each receptor is able to sense different parts of the electromagnetic spectrum. Information about the light spectrum can affect seed germination, the signal to transition from vegetative to flowering, and the production of secondary metabolites such as anthocyanins.

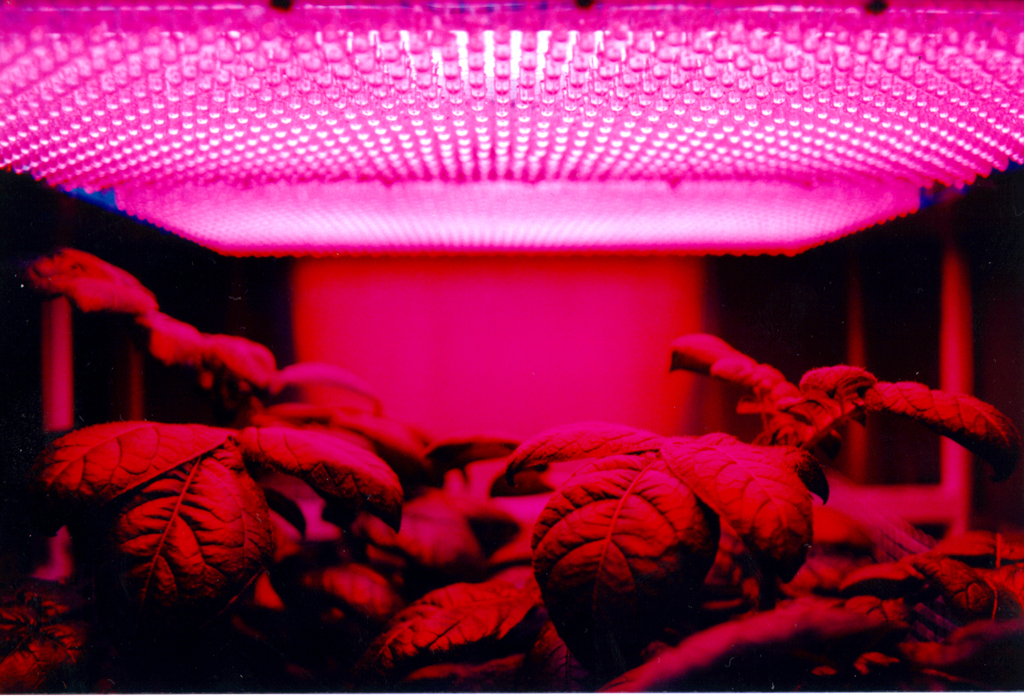
LED panel light source used in an experiment on potato plant growth by NASA

=== Photoperiodism ===
In addition, many plants also require both dark and light periods, an effect known as photoperiodism, to trigger flowering. Therefore, lights may be turned on or off at set times. The optimum photo/dark period ratio depends on the species and variety of plant, as some prefer long days and short nights and others prefer the opposite or intermediate "day lengths".

Much emphasis is placed on photoperiod when discussing plant development. However, it is the number of hours of darkness that affects a plant’s response to day length. In general, a “short-day” is one in which the photoperiod is no more than 12 hours. A “long-day” is one in which the photoperiod is no less than 14 hours. Short-day plants are those that flower when the day length is less than a critical duration. Long-day plants are those that only flower when the photoperiod is greater than a critical duration. Day-neutral plants are those that flower regardless of photoperiod.

Plants that flower in response to photoperiod may have a facultative or obligate response. A facultative response means that a plant will eventually flower regardless of photoperiod, but will flower faster if grown under a particular photoperiod. An obligate response means that the plant will only flower if grown under a certain photoperiod.

=== Photosynthetically Active Radiation (PAR) ===
Weighting factor for photosynthesis. The photon-weighted curve is for converting PPFD to YPF; the energy-weighted curve is for weighting PAR expressed in watts or joules.

Lux and lumens are commonly used to measure light levels, but they are photometric units which measure the intensity of light as perceived by the human eye.

The spectral levels of light that can be used by plants for photosynthesis is similar to, but not the same as, what is measured by lumens. Therefore, when it comes to measuring the amount of light available to plants for photosynthesis, biologists often measure the amount of photosynthetically active radiation (PAR) received by a plant. PAR designates the spectral range of solar radiation from 400 to 700 nanometers, which generally corresponds to the spectral range that photosynthetic organisms are able to use in the process of photosynthesis.

The irradiance of PAR can be expressed in units of energy flux (W/m^{2}), which is relevant in energy-balance considerations for photosynthetic organisms. However, photosynthesis is a quantum process and the chemical reactions of photosynthesis are more dependent on the number of photons than the amount of energy contained in the photons. Therefore, plant biologists often quantify PAR using the number of photons in the 400–700 nm range received by a surface for a specified amount of time, or the Photosynthetic Photon Flux Density (PPFD). This is normally measured using mol m^{−2}s^{−1}, but the value relevant for plant growth is the daily light integral (DLI), the PPFD integrated over 24 hours. Most plant species will grow well with a DLI of 5–15 mol m^{−2} day^{−1}. Shade-tolerant species can grow with DLI values of 1–3 mol m^{−2} day^{−1}, light-demanding species easily handle 30–50 mol m^{−2} day^{−1}.

== International and European standards for horticultural lighting ==
The International Electrotechnical Commission (IEC) has developed a series of international standards (IEC 63403 parts 1 and 2) covering horticultural lighting – LED packages for horticultural lighting, one of them covering the specification sheet and the other one covering binning.

These standards have been adopted in Europe by the European Committee for Electrotechnical Standardization (CENELEC) as European standards EN IEC 63403-1:2024 and EN IEC 63403-2:2024 respectively.

== See also ==
- Andrei Famintsyn – Russian botanist, first to use artificial light for plant growing and research (1868)
- Horticulture
- Photosynthetically active radiation
