= Triptycene =

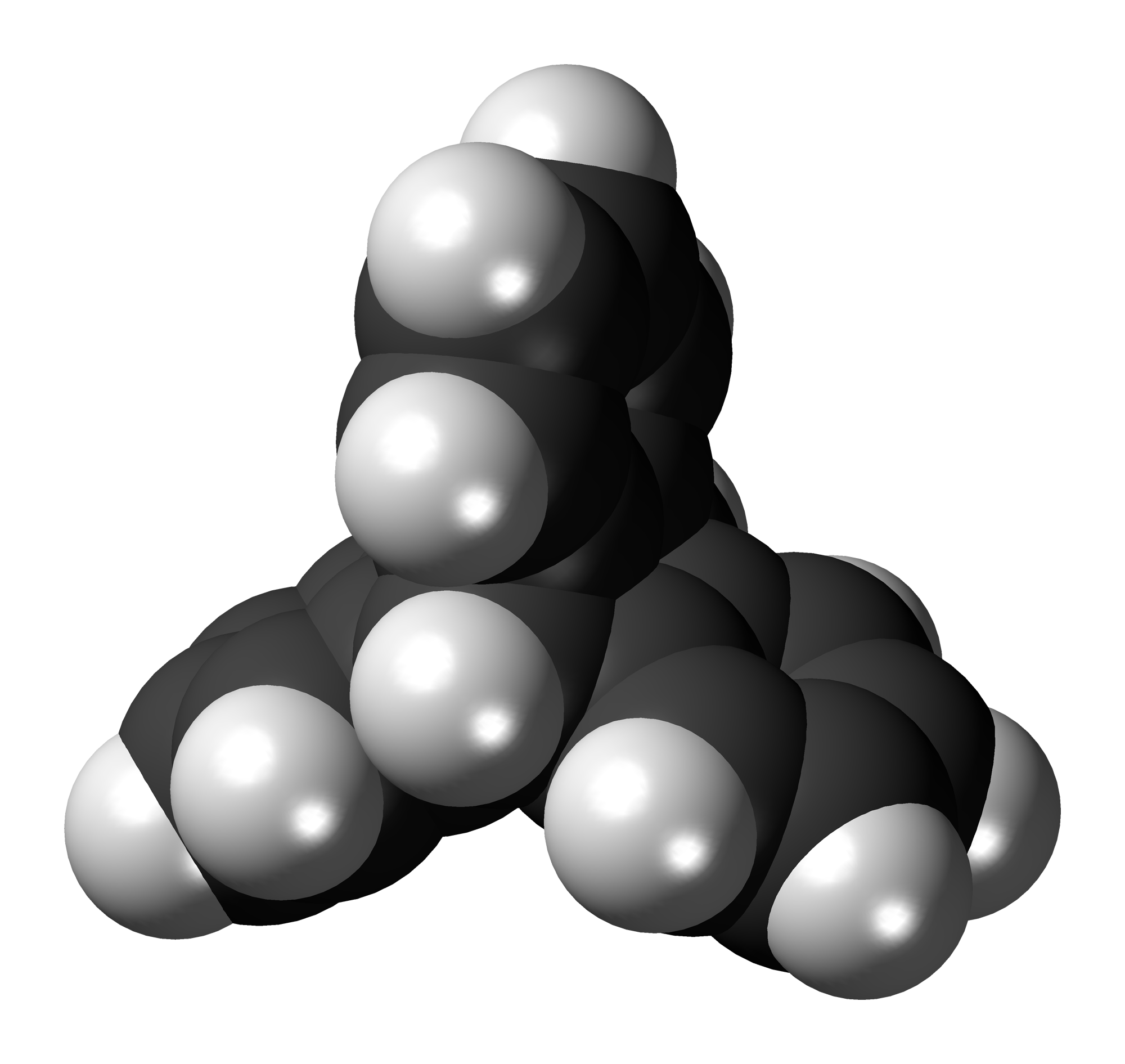

Names
- Preferred IUPAC name 9,10-Dihydro-9,10-[1,2]benzenoanthracene

Identifiers
CAS Number	477-75-8
3D model (JSmol)	Interactive image
ChemSpider	83742
ECHA InfoCard	100.006.837
EC Number	207-519-3
PubChem CID	92764
UNII	CL32869MEP
CompTox Dashboard (EPA)	DTXSID6060058
- InChI: InChI=1S/C20H14/c1-2-8-14-13(7-1)19-15-9-3-5-11-17(15)20(14)18-12-6-4-10-16(18)19/h1-12,19-20H Key: NGDCLPXRKSWRPY-UHFFFAOYSA-N
- SMILES: C12=CC=CC=C1C3C5=C(C=CC=C5)C2C4=C3C=CC=C4

Properties
Chemical formula	C_{20}H_{14}
Molar mass	254.332 g·mol^{−1}
Density	1.197 g/cm^{3}
Melting point	252 to 256 °C (486 to 493 °F; 525 to 529 K)
Boiling point	371.8 °C (701.2 °F; 645.0 K)
- Except where otherwise noted, data are given for materials in their standard state (at 25 °C [77 °F], 100 kPa). verify (what is ?) Infobox references

Triptycene is an aromatic hydrocarbon, the simplest iptycene molecule with the formula C_{2}H_{2}(C_{6}H_{4})_{3}. It is a white solid that is soluble in organic solvents. The compound has a paddle-wheel configuration with D_{3h} symmetry. It is named after the medieval three-piece art panel, the triptych. Several substituted triptycenes are known. Barrelenes are structurally related. Due to the rigid framework and three-dimensional geometry, derivatives of triptycene have been well-researched.

== Synthesis ==
The parent triptycene was first prepared in 1942 by a multistep method. It can also be prepared in one step in 28% yield from the Diels–Alder reaction of anthracene and benzyne. In this method, benzyne is generated by the reaction of magnesium and 2-bromofluorobenzene.

== Derivatives and applications ==
The hydrocarbon framework is very rigid, and triptycene derivatives such as triptycene quinones are therefore incorporated in many organic compounds as a molecular scaffold for various applications, such as molecular motors or ligands.

For example, a bis(diphenylphosphino) derivative was used as a phosphine ligand on nickel in a highly selective hydrocyanation reaction of butadiene. The reactivity of this catalyst is attributed to the large bite angle of the bidentate ligand supported by the triptycene framework.
