= Iptycene =

Chemical structure of triptycene, the simplest iptycene

An iptycene is an aromatic compound composed of varying number of arene subunits bound to a bridged bicyclo-octatriene core structure. They are formally derivatives of barrelene. The first and simplest iptycene molecule is triptycene.

The first iptycene was reported in 1931 by Erich Clar. Paul Bartlett's research group developed Clar's method and made the first triptycene. Following Bertlett's work on triptycene, Hart et al., with acknowledgement to Professor Joel F. Liebman, proposed the trivial name iptycene for this class of molecules.
