= Bicyclooctanes =

Bicyclooctanes are bicyclic organic compounds. The parent compounds, which have little significance per se, have the formula C_{8}H_{14}. These ring systems have received considerable scrutiny. The parent molecules are all colorless, as expected for saturated hydrocarbons.

From left: bicyclo[3.3.0]octane, bicyclo[2.2.2]octane, and bicyclo[3.2.1]octane

Bicyclooctane Parent Hydrocarbonss
Parent Bicyclooctane	Registry number (RN)	melting point (°C)	example
Bicyclo[3.3.0]octane	694-72-4	-30	dodecahedrane
Bicyclo[3.2.1]octane	6221-55-2	133-134	gibberellin
Bicyclo[2.2.2]octane	280-33-1	168-170	triptycene
Bicyclo[4.2.0]octane	28282-35-1		
Bicyclo[4.1.1]octane	7078-34-4		
Bicyclo[5.1.0]octane	16526-90-2		
