= Photosynthetically active radiation =

Range of light usable for photosynthesis

Photosynthetically active radiation (PAR) spans the visible light portion of the electromagnetic spectrum from 400 to 700 nanometers.

Photosynthetically active radiation (PAR) designates the spectral range (wave band) of solar radiation from 400 to 700 nanometers that photosynthetic organisms are able to use in the process of photosynthesis. This spectral region corresponds more or less with the range of light visible to the human eye. Photons at shorter wavelengths tend to be so energetic that they can be damaging to cells and tissues, but are mostly filtered out by the ozone layer in the stratosphere. Photons at longer wavelengths do not carry enough energy to allow photosynthesis to take place.

Other living organisms, such as cyanobacteria, purple bacteria, and heliobacteria, can exploit solar light in slightly extended spectral regions, such as the near-infrared. These bacteria live in environments such as the bottom of stagnant ponds, sediment and ocean depths. Because of their pigments, they form colorful mats of green, red and purple.

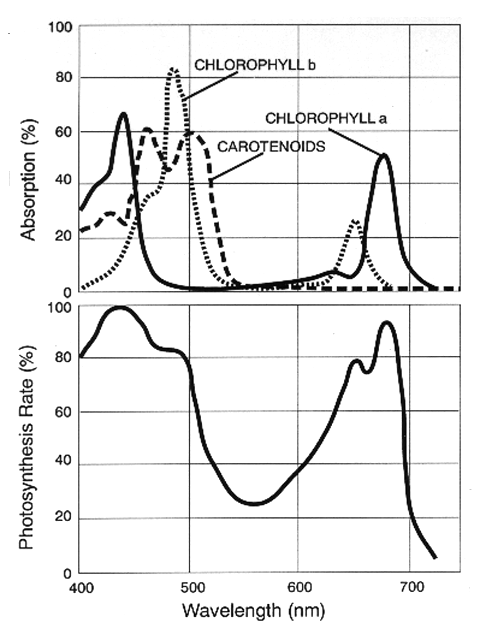
Top: Absorption spectra for chlorophyll-A, chlorophyll-B, and carotenoids extracted in a solution. Bottom: PAR action spectrum (oxygen evolution per incident photon) of an isolated chloroplast.

Chlorophyll, the most abundant plant pigment, is most efficient in capturing red and blue light. Accessory pigments such as carotenes and xanthophylls harvest some green light and pass it on to the photosynthetic process, but enough of the green wavelengths are reflected to give leaves their characteristic color. An exception to the predominance of chlorophyll is autumn, when chlorophyll is degraded (because it contains N and Mg) but the accessory pigments are not (because they only contain C, H and O) and remain in the leaf producing red, yellow and orange leaves.

In land plants, leaves absorb mostly red and blue light in the first layer of photosynthetic cells because of chlorophyll absorbance. Green light, however, penetrates deeper into the leaf interior and can drive photosynthesis more efficiently than red light. Because green and yellow wavelengths can transmit through chlorophyll and the entire leaf itself, they play a crucial role in growth beneath the plant canopy.

PAR measurement is used in agriculture, forestry and oceanography. One of the requirements for productive farmland is adequate PAR, so PAR is used to evaluate agricultural investment potential. PAR sensors stationed at various levels of the forest canopy measure the pattern of PAR availability and utilization. Photosynthetic rate and related parameters can be measured non-destructively using a photosynthesis system, and these instruments measure PAR and sometimes control PAR at set intensities. PAR measurements are also used to calculate the euphotic depth in the ocean.

In these contexts, the reason PAR is preferred over other lighting metrics such as luminous flux and illuminance is that these measures are based on human perception of brightness, which is strongly green biased and does not accurately describe the quantity of light usable for photosynthesis.

== Units ==
Unit	Definition
Photosynthetic photon flux (PPF)	Photosynthetic photon flux (PPF) micromoles per second (μmol·s^{−1})
Photosynthetic Photon Flux Density (PPFD)	Photosynthetic photon flux (PPF) micromoles per square meter per second (μmol·m^{−2}·s^{−1})
Yield photon flux (YPF)	Yield photon flux (YPF) micromoles per second (μmol·s^{−1})
Yield photon flux density (YPFD)	Yield photon flux (YPF) micromoles per square meter per second (μmol·m^{−2}·s^{−1})

When measuring the irradiance of PAR, values are expressed using units of energy (W/m^{2}), which is relevant in energy-balance considerations for photosynthetic organisms.

However, photosynthesis is a quantum process and the chemical reactions of photosynthesis are more dependent on the number of photons than the energy contained in the photons. Therefore, plant biologists often quantify PAR using the number of photons in the 400-700 nm range received by a surface for a specified amount of time, or the Photosynthetic Photon Flux Density (PPFD). Values of PPFD are normally expressed using units of mol⋅m^{−2}⋅s^{−1}. In relation to plant growth and morphology, it is better to characterise the light availability for plants by means of the Daily Light Integral (DLI), which is the daily flux of photons per ground area, and includes both diurnal variation as well as variation in day length.

PPFD used to sometimes be expressed using einstein units, i.e., μE⋅m^{−2}⋅s^{−1}, although this usage is nonstandard and is no longer used.

=== Light fixture efficiency ===
Unit	Calculation
Daily light integral (DLI)	0.0036 × PPFD (μmol⋅m^{−2}⋅s^{−1}) × duration of exposure
Photosynthetic photon efficacy (PPE)	Photosynthetic photon flux (PPF) μmol/W

== Yield photon flux ==
Weighting factor for photosynthesis. The photon-weighted curve is for converting PPF to YPF; the energy-weighted curve is for weighting PAR expressed in watts or joules.

There are two common measures of photosynthetically active radiation: photosynthetic photon flux (PPF) and yield photon flux (YPF). PPF values all photons from 400 to 700 nm equally, while YPF weights photons in the range from 360 to 760 nm based on a plant's photosynthetic response.

PAR as described with PPF does not distinguish between different wavelengths between 400 and 700 nm, and assumes that wavelengths outside this range have zero photosynthetic action. If the exact spectrum of the light is known, the photosynthetic photon flux density (PPFD) values in μmol⋅s^{−1}⋅m^{−2}) can be modified by applying different weighting factors to different wavelengths. This results in a quantity called the yield photon flux (YPF). The red curve in the graph shows that photons around 610 nm (orange-red) have the highest amount of photosynthesis per photon. However, because short-wavelength photons carry more energy per photon, the maximum amount of photosynthesis per incident unit of energy is at a longer wavelength, around 650 nm (deep red).

It has been noted that there is considerable misunderstanding over the effect of light quality on plant growth. Many manufacturers claim significantly increased plant growth due to light quality (high YPF). The YPF curve indicates that orange and red photons between 600 and 630 nm can result in 20 to 30% more photosynthesis than blue or cyan photons between 400 and 540 nm. But the YPF curve was developed from short-term measurements made on single leaves in low light. More recent longer-term studies with whole plants in higher light indicate that light quality may have a smaller effect on plant growth rate than light quantity. Blue light, while not delivering as many photons per joule, encourages leaf growth and affects other outcomes.

The conversion between energy-based PAR and photon-based PAR depends on the spectrum of the light source (see Photosynthetic efficiency). The following table shows the conversion factors from watts for black-body spectra that are truncated to the range 400–700 nm. It also shows the luminous efficacy for these light sources and the fraction of a real black-body radiator that is emitted as PAR.

T [K]	η_{v} [lm/W*]	η_{photon} [μmol/J*] or [μmol⋅s^{−1}⋅W*^{−1}]	η_{photon} [mol⋅day^{−1}⋅W*^{−1}]	η_{PAR} [W*/W]
3000 (warm white)	269	4.98	0.43	0.0809
4000	277	4.78	0.413	0.208
5800 (daylight)	265	4.56	0.394	0.368
Note: W* and J* indicate PAR watts and PAR joules (400–700 nm).

For example, a light source of 1000 lm at a color temperature of 5800 K would emit approximately 1000/265 = 3.8 W of PAR, which is equivalent to 3.8 × 4.56 = 17.3 μmol/s. For a black-body light source at 5800 K, such as the sun is approximately, a fraction 0.368 of its total emitted radiation is emitted as PAR. For artificial light sources, that usually do not have a black-body spectrum, these conversion factors are only approximate.

The quantities in the table are calculated as

$$\eta_v(T) = \frac{\int_{\lambda_1}^{\lambda_2} B(\lambda, T)\, 683 \mathrm{~[lm/W]}\, y(\lambda)\,d\lambda}{\int_{\lambda_1}^{\lambda_2} B(\lambda, T)\,d\lambda},$$
$$\eta_{\mathrm{photon}}(T) = \frac{\int_{\lambda_1}^{\lambda_2} B(\lambda, T)\,\frac{\lambda}{hcN_\text{A}} \,d\lambda}{\int_{\lambda_1}^{\lambda_2} B(\lambda, T)\,d\lambda},$$
$$\eta_{\mathrm{PAR}}(T) = \frac{\int_{\lambda_1}^{\lambda_2} B(\lambda, T)\,d\lambda}{\int_0^{\infty} B(\lambda, T)\,d\lambda},$$

where $B(\lambda,T)$ is the black-body spectrum according to Planck's law, $y$ is the standard luminosity function, $\lambda_1,\lambda_2$ represent the wavelength range (400–700 nm) of PAR, and $N_\text{A}$ is the Avogadro constant.

== Second law PAR efficiency ==
Besides the amount of radiation reaching a plant in the PAR region of the spectrum, it is also important to consider the quality of such radiation. Radiation reaching a plant contains entropy as well as energy, and combining those two concepts the exergy can be determined. This sort of analysis is known as exergy analysis or second law analysis, and the exergy represents a measure of the useful work, i.e., the useful part of radiation which can be transformed into other forms of energy.

The spectral distribution of the exergy of radiation is defined as:

$$Ex_\lambda = L_\lambda(T) - L_\lambda(T_0) - T_0 [S_\lambda(T) - S_\lambda(T_0)]$$

One of the advantages of working with the exergy is that it depends not only on the temperature of the emitter (the Sun), $T$, but also on the temperature of the receiving body (the plant), $T_0$, i.e., it includes the fact that the plant is emitting radiation. Naming $x = \frac{hc}{\lambda k T}$ and $y = \frac{hc}{\lambda k T_0}$, the exergy emissive power of radiation in a region is determined as:

$$\int_{0}^{\lambda_i} Ex(\lambda,T)d\lambda = \Im_{Ex_{0 \rightarrow \lambda_i}} = \frac{15}{\pi^4}\sigma  \left\{  T^3 \left[ (T-T_0)x^3\mathrm{Li}_1(e^{-x}) + (3T - 4T_0)x^2\mathrm{Li}_2(e^{-x}) \right. \right.$$
$$+ \left. (6T - 8T_0)x\mathrm{Li}_3(e^{-x}) + (6T-8T_0)\mathrm{Li}_4(e^{-x})      \right]$$
$$+ \left.  T_0^4 \left[  y^2 \mathrm{Li}_2(e^{-y}) + 2 y \mathrm{Li}_3(e^{-y}) + 2 \mathrm{Li}_4(e^{-y})    \right]   \right\}$$

Where $\mathrm{Li}_s(z)$ is a special function called the polylogarithm. By definition, the exergy obtained by the receiving body is always lower than the energy radiated by the emitting blackbody, as a consequence of the entropy content in radiation. Thus, as a consequence of the entropy content, not all the radiation reaching the Earth's surface is "useful" to produce work. Therefore, the efficiency of a process involving radiation should be measured against its exergy, not its energy.

Using the expression above, the optimal efficiency or second law efficiency for the conversion of radiation to work in the PAR region (from $\lambda_1 =$ 400 nm to $\lambda_2 =$ 700 nm), for a blackbody at $T$ = 5800 K and an organism at $T_0$ = 300 K is determined as:

$$\eta^{ex}_\text{PAR}(T) = \frac{\int_{\lambda_1}^{\lambda_2} Ex(\lambda,T)d\lambda}{\int_{0}^\infty L(\lambda, T)d\lambda} = 0.337563$$

about 8.3% lower than the value considered until now, as a direct consequence of the fact that the organisms which are using solar radiation are also emitting radiation as a consequence of their own temperature. Therefore, the conversion factor of the organism will be different depending on its temperature, and the exergy concept is more suitable than the energy one.

== Measurement ==
PAR is normally measured with a PAR meter, which measures the amount of light in the 400-700 nanometer range that plants use for photosynthesis. There are several commercial varieties, as well as a multi-channel spectral sensor-based version that has lower costs and was released as open hardware.

Researchers at Utah State University compared PPF and YPF measurements using various equipment. They measured the PPF and YPF of seven common radiation sources with a spectroradiometer, then compared them with measurements from six quantum sensors designed to measure PPF and three quantum sensors designed to measure YPF.

They found that the PPF and YPF sensors were the least accurate for narrow-band sources (narrow spectrum of light) and most accurate for broad-band sources (fuller spectra of light). They found that PPF sensors were significantly more accurate under metal halide, low-pressure sodium and high-pressure sodium lamps than YPF sensors (>9% difference). Both YPF and PPF sensors were very inaccurate (>18% error) when used to measure light from red-light-emitting diodes.

== Similar measurement ==
=== Photobiologically Active Radiation (PBAR) ===
Photobiologically Active Radiation (PBAR) is a range of light energy beyond and including PAR. Photobiological Photon Flux (PBF) is the metric used to measure PBAR.

== See also ==
- Action spectrum
- Daily light integral
- Electromagnetic absorption by water
- Grow light
- Photon counting
