= Einstein (unit) =

Obsolete unit with conflicting definitions

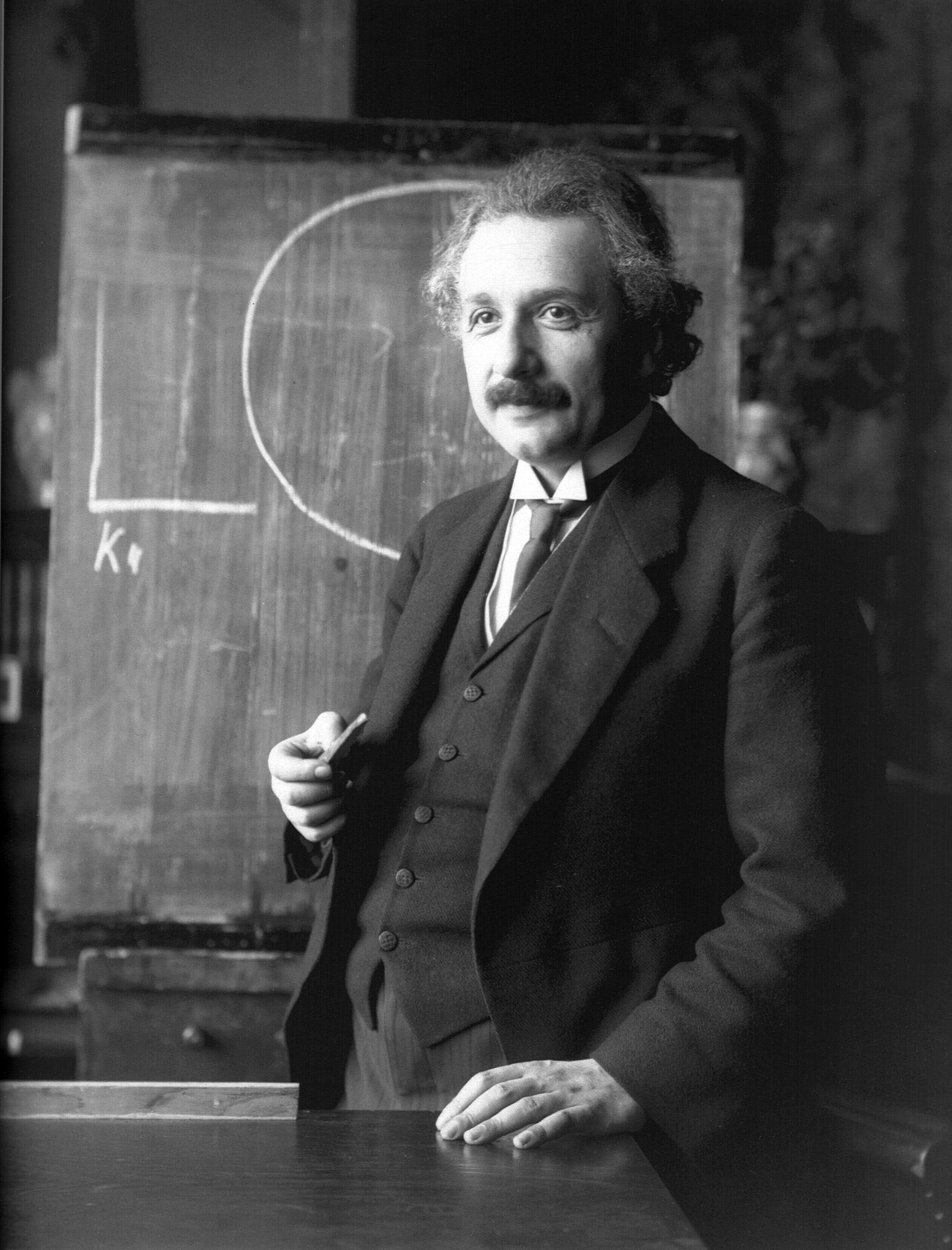
Albert Einstein, the namesake of the unit.

The einstein (symbol E) is an obsolete unit with two conflicting definitions. It was originally defined as the energy in one mole of photons (6.022×10^{23} photons). Because energy is inversely proportional to wavelength, the unit is frequency dependent. This unit is not part of the International System of Units (SI) and is redundant with the joule. If it were still in use, as of the 2019 revision of the SI, its value would be related to the frequency of the electromagnetic radiation by

1 einstein = 1 mol × N_{A} h f = 1 mol × 6.02214076×10^{23} mol^{−1} × 6.62607015×10^{−34} J⋅s × f = 3.9903127128934321×10^{−10} J⋅s × f,

where N_{A} is the Avogadro constant, h is the Planck constant, and f is the frequency.

Sometime later, the unit was used differently in studies of photosynthesis to mean one mole of photons, rather than the energy in one mole of photons. As such, photosynthetically active radiation (PAR) was formerly often reported in microeinsteins per second per square meter (μE⋅m^{−2}⋅s^{−1}). This usage is also not part of the SI and when used this way it is redundant with the mole.

Since the unit does not have a standard definition and is not part of the SI system, it has long been considered obsolete. The same information about photosynthetically active radiation can be conveyed using the SI convention by stating something such as "a photon flux of 1500 μmol⋅m^{−2}⋅s^{−1}".

This unit was named after physicist Albert Einstein.
