= Bullvalene =

Organic molecule (C10H10)

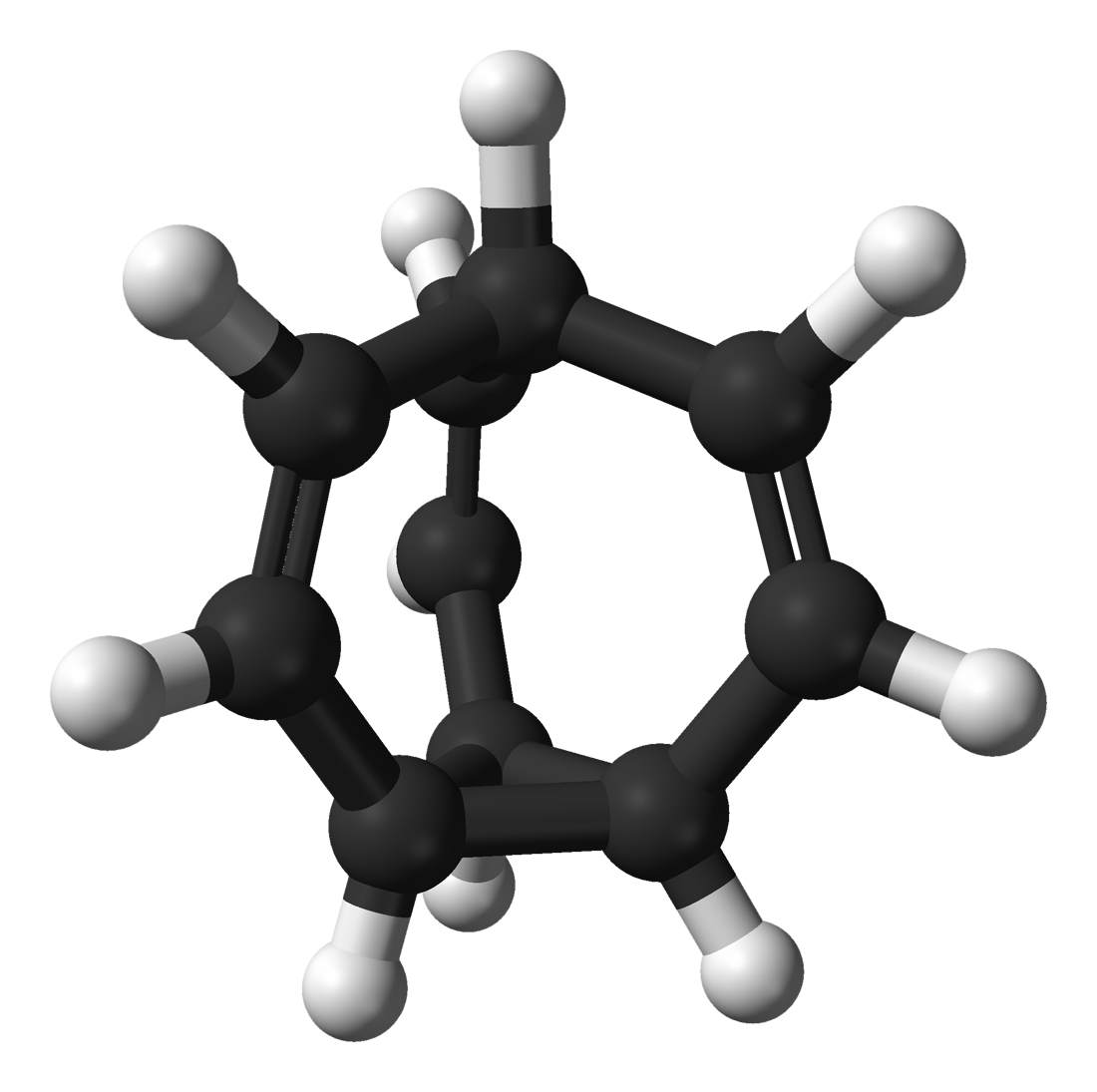

Names
- Preferred IUPAC name Tricyclo[3.3.2.0^{2,8}]deca-3,6,9-triene
- Other names Bullvalen

Identifiers
CAS Number	1005-51-2
3D model (JSmol)	Interactive image
ChemSpider	120549
PubChem CID	136796
UNII	ZQZ1X09E2B
CompTox Dashboard (EPA)	DTXSID80143348
- InChI: InChI=1S/C10H10/c1-4-8-9-5-2-7(1)3-6-10(8)9/h1-10H Key: UKFBVTJTKMSPMI-UHFFFAOYSA-N; InChI=1/C10H10/c1-4-8-9-5-2-7(1)3-6-10(8)9/h1-10H Key: UKFBVTJTKMSPMI-UHFFFAOYAK
- SMILES: C\2=C\C/1\C=C/C3C(\C=C\1)C/23

Properties
Chemical formula	C_{10}H_{10}
Molar mass	130.19 g/mol
Melting point	96 °C (205 °F; 369 K)
Boiling point	decomposition at about 400 °C (752 °F; 673 K)
- Except where otherwise noted, data are given for materials in their standard state (at 25 °C [77 °F], 100 kPa). verify (what is ?) Infobox references

Bullvalene is a hydrocarbon with the chemical formula C_{10}H_{10}. The molecule has a cage-like structure formed by the fusion of one cyclopropane and three cyclohepta-1,4-diene rings. Bullvalene is unusual as an organic molecule due to the C−C and C=C bonds forming and breaking rapidly through Cope rearrangements; this property makes it a fluxional molecule.

== Stereodynamics ==
The bullvalene molecule is a cyclopropane platform with three vinylene arms conjoined at a methine group. This arrangement enables a degenerate Cope rearrangement with the result that all carbon atoms and hydrogen atoms appear equivalent on the NMR timescale. At room temperature the ^{1}H NMR signals average to a rounded peak at 5.76 ppm. At lower temperatures the peak broadens into a mound-like appearance, and at very low temperatures the fluxional behavior of bullvalene is reduced, allowing for 4 total signals to be seen. This pattern is consistent with an exchange process whose rate k is close to the frequency separation of the four contributing resonances. The number of possible valence tautomers of a bullvalene depends on the number of unique substituents. The number of isomers with ten distinguishable substituents is 10!/3 = 1,209,600.

== Synthesis ==
In 1963, G. Schröder produced bullvalene by photolysis of a dimer of cyclooctatetraene. The reaction proceeds with expulsion of benzene.

In 1966 W. von Eggers Doering and Joel W. Rosenthal synthesized it by the photochemical rearrangement of cis-9,10-dihydronaphthalene.

== Related compounds ==
=== Bullvalones ===
In bullvalones one vinyl group in one of the arms in bullvalene is replaced by a keto group on a methylene bridge. In this way it is possible to activate the fluxional state by adding base and deactivate it again by removing the base:

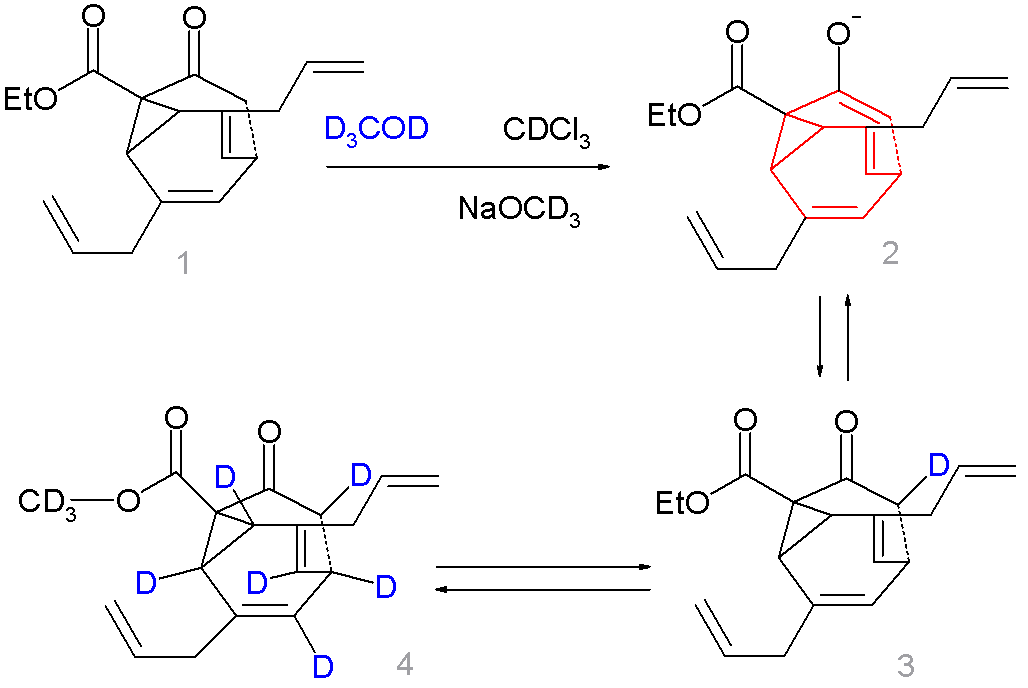
Scheme 2. A bullvalone

Compound 1 in scheme 2 is not a fluxional molecule but by adding base (sodium methoxide in methanol) the ketone converts to the enolate 2 and the fluxional state is switched on. Deuterium labeling is possible forming first 3 a then a complex mixture with up to 7 deuterium atoms, compound 4 being just one of them.

=== Semibullvalene ===
In semibullvalene (C_{8}H_{8}), one ethylene arm is replaced by a single bond. The compound was first prepared by photolysis of barrelene in isopentane with acetone as a photosensitizer in 1966.

Scheme 3. Semibullvalene synthesis

Semibullvalene exists only as two valence tautomers (2a and 2b in scheme 3) but in this molecule the Cope rearrangement takes place even at −110 °C, a temperature at which this type of reaction is ordinarily not possible.

One insight into the reaction mechanism for this photoreaction is given by an isotope scrambling experiment. The 6 vinylic protons in barrelene 1 are more acidic than the two bridgehead protons and therefore they can be replaced by deuterium with N-deuteriocyclohexylamide. Photolysis of 2 results in the initial formation of a biradical intermediate with a cyclopropane ring formed. This product rearranges to a second intermediate with a more favorable allylic radical as two mesomers. Intersystem crossing and radical recombination results in equal quantities of semibullvalenes 3 and 4. The new proton distribution with allylic, vinylic and cyclopropanyl protons determined with proton NMR confirms this model. As noted, the conversion of barrelene to semibullvalene is a di-π-methane rearrangement.

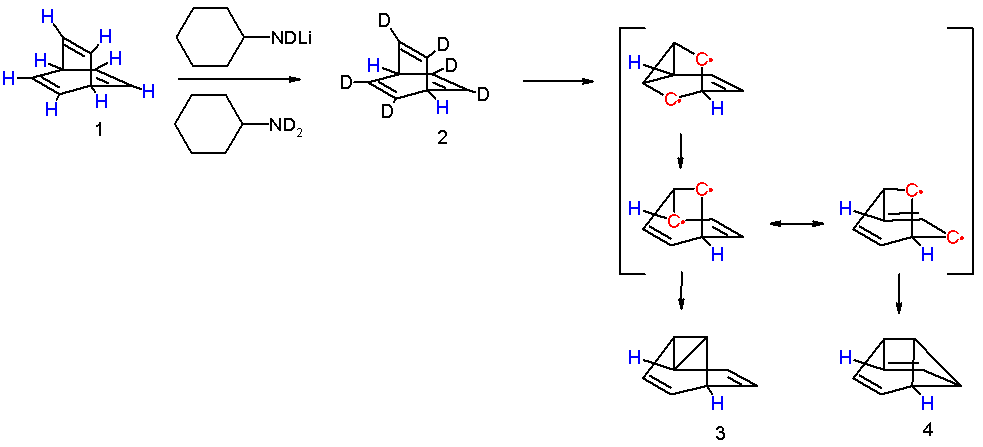
Scheme 4. Barrelene photolysis mechanism

A synthetic procedure for alkylated semibullvalenes published in 2006 is based on cyclodimerisation of a substituted 1,4-dilithio-1,3-butadiene with copper(I) bromide. At 140 °C the ethylated semibullvalene isomerises to the cyclooctatetraene derivative.

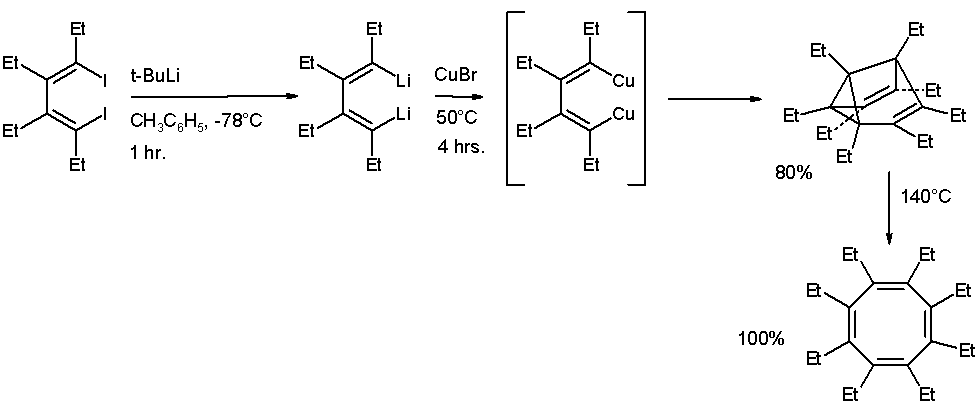
Scheme 5. New semibullvalene synthesis

=== Barbaralane ===
In barbaralane, one ethylene arm is replaced by a methylene bridge and the dynamics are comparable to that of semibullvalene. There is also an intermediate ketone in bullvalene synthesis called "barbaralone". Both are named after Barbara M. Ferrier, (1932–2006) professor of the Department of Biochemistry and Biomedical Sciences at McMaster University.

== Origin of the name ==
The name bullvalene is derived from the nickname of one of the scientists who predicted its properties in 1963 and the underlying concept of valence tautomerism, William "Bull" Doering. According to Klärner in 2011, the weekly seminars organised by Doering were secretly called "Bull sessions" by PhD students and postdocs and "were feared by those who were poorly prepared". The name was bestowed on the molecule, in 1961, by two of Doering's Yale graduate students, Maitland Jones Jr and Ron Magid. The name celebrates Bill Doering's well-known nickname and was chosen to rhyme with fulvalene, a molecule of great interest to the research group.
