= Coumalic acid =

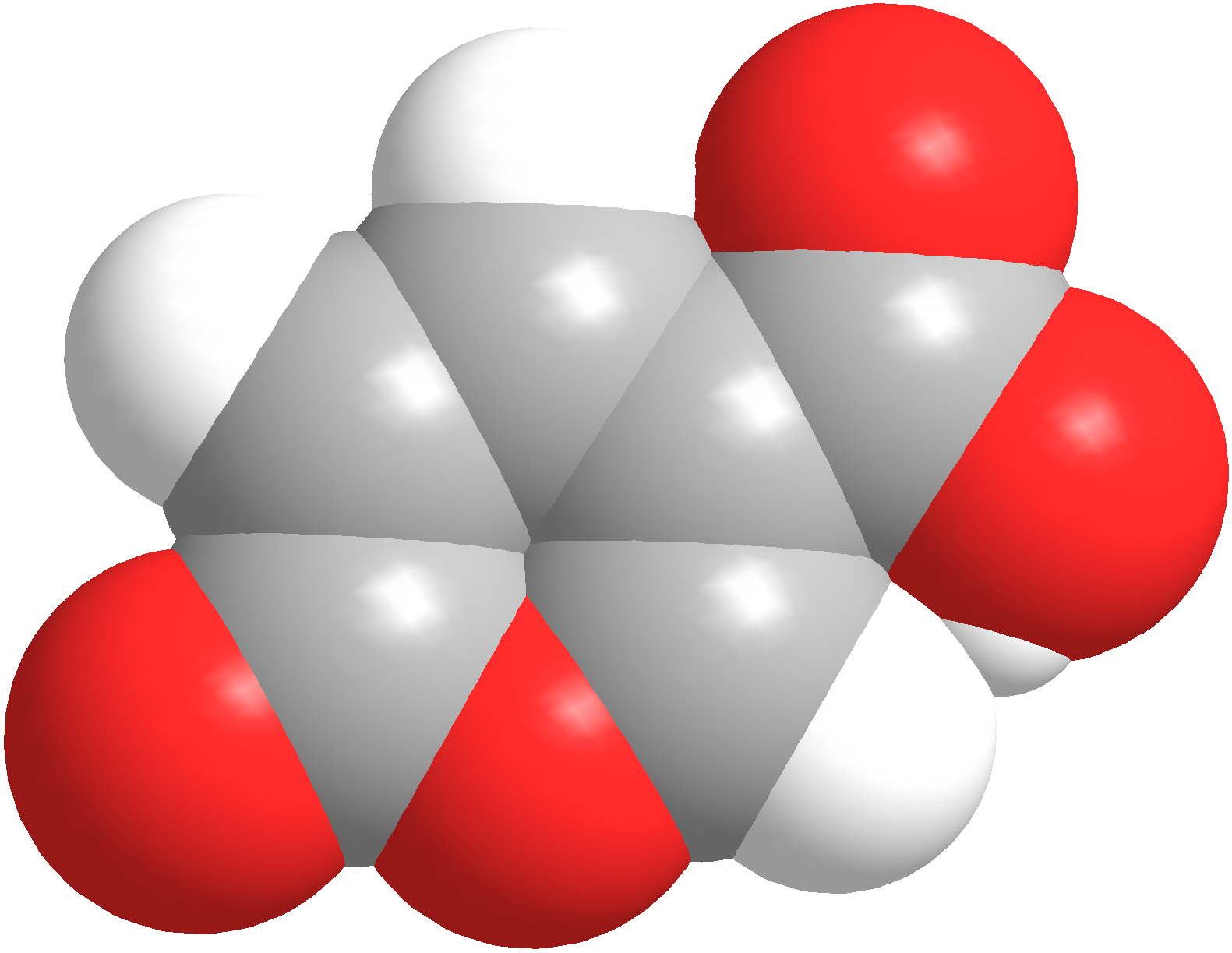

Names
- Preferred IUPAC name 2-Oxo-2H-pyran-5-carboxylic acid
- Other names Cumalic acid

Identifiers
CAS Number	500-05-0
3D model (JSmol)	Interactive image
ChEBI	CHEBI:180952
ChEMBL	ChEMBL216734
ChemSpider	61449
ECHA InfoCard	100.007.182
EC Number	207-899-0
PubChem CID	68141
UNII	OB1JPY343G
CompTox Dashboard (EPA)	DTXSID60870569
- InChI: InChI=1S/C6H4O4/c7-5-2-1-4(3-10-5)6(8)9/h1-3H,(H,8,9) Key: ORGPJDKNYMVLFL-UHFFFAOYSA-N
- SMILES: C1=CC(=O)OC=C1C(=O)O

Properties
Chemical formula	C_{6}H_{4}O_{4}
Molar mass	140.094 g·mol^{−1}
Appearance	yellow solid
Melting point	210 °C (410 °F; 483 K)

Hazards
- GHS labelling
Pictograms	(GHS07: Exclamation mark)
Signal word	Warning
Hazard statements	H315, H319, H335
Precautionary statements	P261, P264, P264+P265, P271, P280, P302+P352, P304+P340, P305+P351+P338, P319, P321, P332+P317, P337+P317, P362+P364, P403+P233, P405, P501
- Except where otherwise noted, data are given for materials in their standard state (at 25 °C [77 °F], 100 kPa). Infobox references

Coumalic acid is an organic compound with the molecular formula C_{6}H_{4}O_{4}. Its melting point is around 210 °C.

In laboratory coumalic acid may be obtained by self-condensation of malic acid in fuming sulfuric acid:
