= Barrelene =

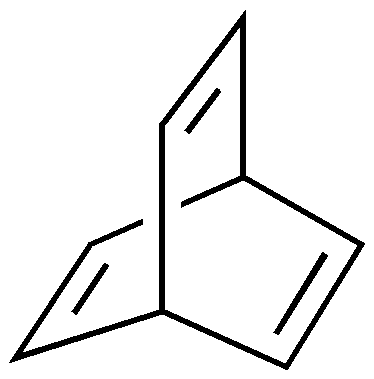

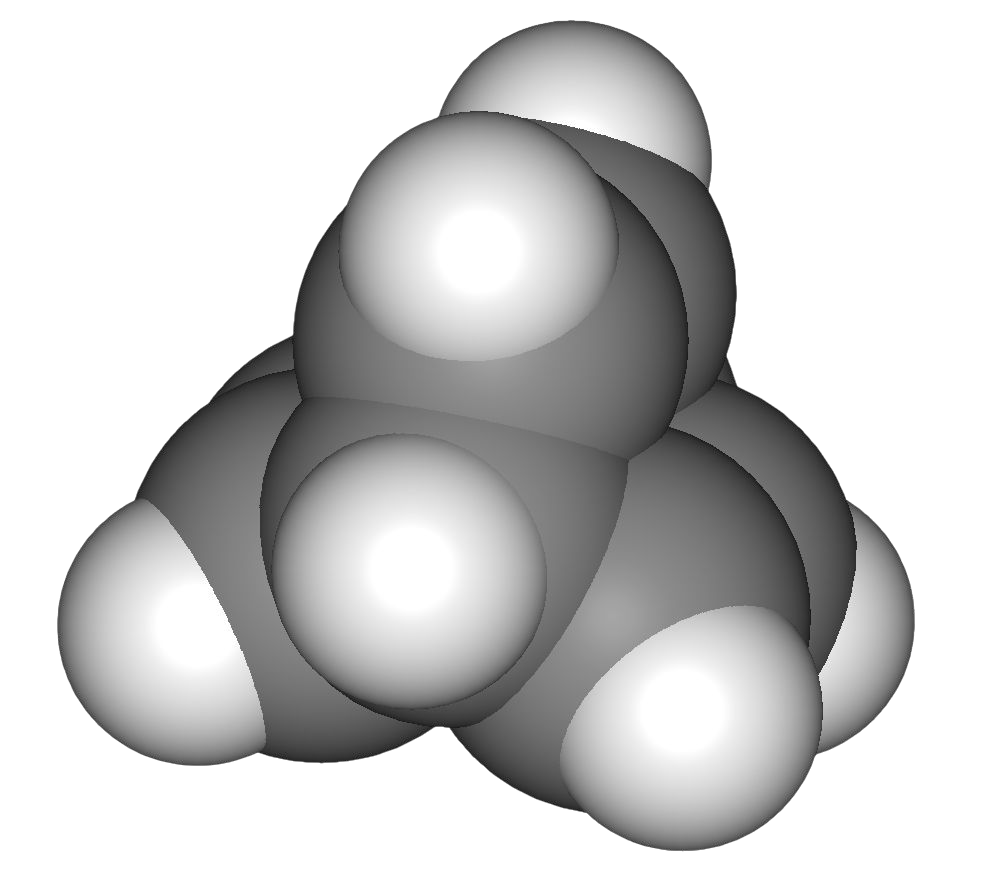

Names
- Preferred IUPAC name Bicyclo[2.2.2]octa-2,5,7-triene

Identifiers
CAS Number	500-24-3
3D model (JSmol)	Interactive image; Interactive image
ChemSpider	120100
PubChem CID	136326
UNII	2P5L4Z7K7I
CompTox Dashboard (EPA)	DTXSID80198171
- InChI: InChI=1S/C8H8/c1-2-8-5-3-7(1)4-6-8/h1-8H Key: RHCCUQVVABYRDN-UHFFFAOYSA-N; InChI=1/C8H8/c1-2-8-5-3-7(1)4-6-8/h1-8H Key: RHCCUQVVABYRDN-UHFFFAOYAN
- SMILES: C1(C=C2)C=CC2C=C1; C\1=C\C\2/C=C\C/1/C=C/2

Properties
Chemical formula	C_{8}H_{8}
Molar mass	104.15
Density	1.013 g/mL
Boiling point	153.7 °C (308.7 °F; 426.8 K)
- Except where otherwise noted, data are given for materials in their standard state (at 25 °C [77 °F], 100 kPa). verify (what is ?) Infobox references

Barrelene is a bicyclic organic compound with chemical formula C_{8}H_{8} and systematic name bicyclo[2.2.2]octa-2,5,7-triene. First synthesized and described by Howard Zimmerman in 1960, the name derives from the resemblance to a barrel, with the staves being three ethylene units attached to two methine groups. It is the formal Diels–Alder adduct of benzene and acetylene. Due to its unusual molecular geometry, the compound is of considerable interest to theoretical chemists.

Iptycenes, with the alkene groups part of an arenes, are related compounds. It is also a starting material for many other organic compounds, such as semibullvalene.

== Synthesis ==
The original Zimmerman synthesis modified in 1969 starts from coumalic acid: (Note: Reaction scheme: decarboxylation of coumalic acid (1) takes place at 650 °C with copper to give α-pyrone (2). The reaction with methyl vinyl ketone (3) is a tandem Diels–Alder/retro-Diels–Alder/Diels–Alder sequence, which yields di-ketone 5 as a mixture of two isomers. It is possible to convert the endo isomer 5b to the exo isomer 5a by an epimerization process through the enol. The ketone groups are converted to oxime groups in 6 by reaction with hydroxylamine and then to the tosylate groups in 7 by reaction with tosyl chloride. A basic Beckmann rearrangement takes the scheme to give amide 8 and its hydrolysis to the di-amine 9 takes place with sodium hydroxide. Finally, a Hofmann elimination through ammonium salt 10 gives the barrelene 11.)

The synthesis of barrelene as reported by Zimmermann in 1969.

Many alternative routes have been devised since then, one of them starting from benzene oxide:

An alternate route that allows synthesis of the parent barrelene system and a variety of substituted barrelenes has also been reported.

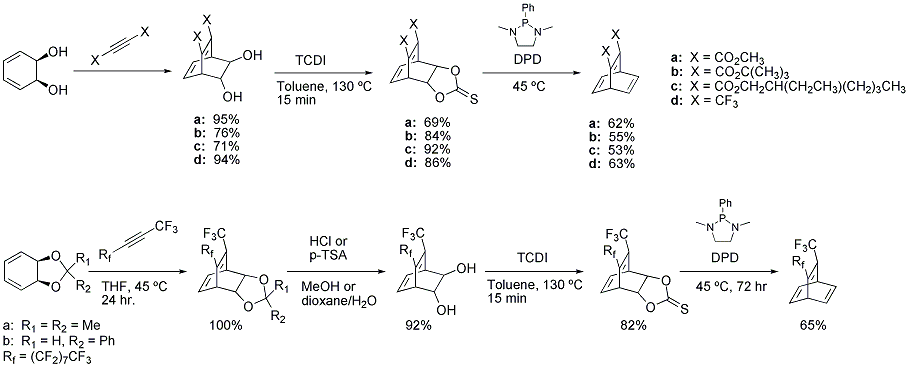

== Barrelene reactions ==
Barrelene is hydrogenated with hydrogen gas and Adams' catalyst in ethanol to the fully saturated bicyclo[2.2.2]-octane. Bromination with bromine in tetrachloromethane gives a di-bromo adduct because a coupling reaction intervenes:

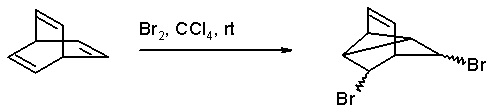

Epoxidation of barrelene with oxone gives the trioxatrishomobarrelene which on rearrangement with boron trifluoride (driving force:relief of strain energy) converts into the trioxatrishomocubane:

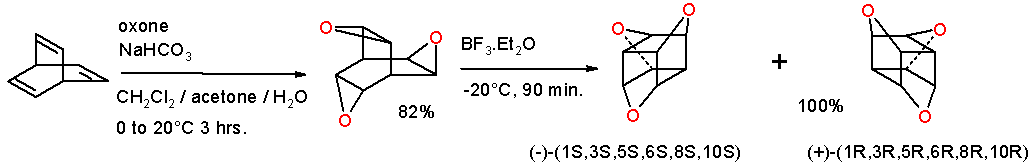

This compound can be envisioned as a cubane with three oxygen atoms inserted into three opposite edges or as 9-crown-3 capped by two methine units. The molecule is chiral and the separate enantiomers have been isolated.

Certain barrelenes have been used as a monomer in a ring opening metathesis polymerization:

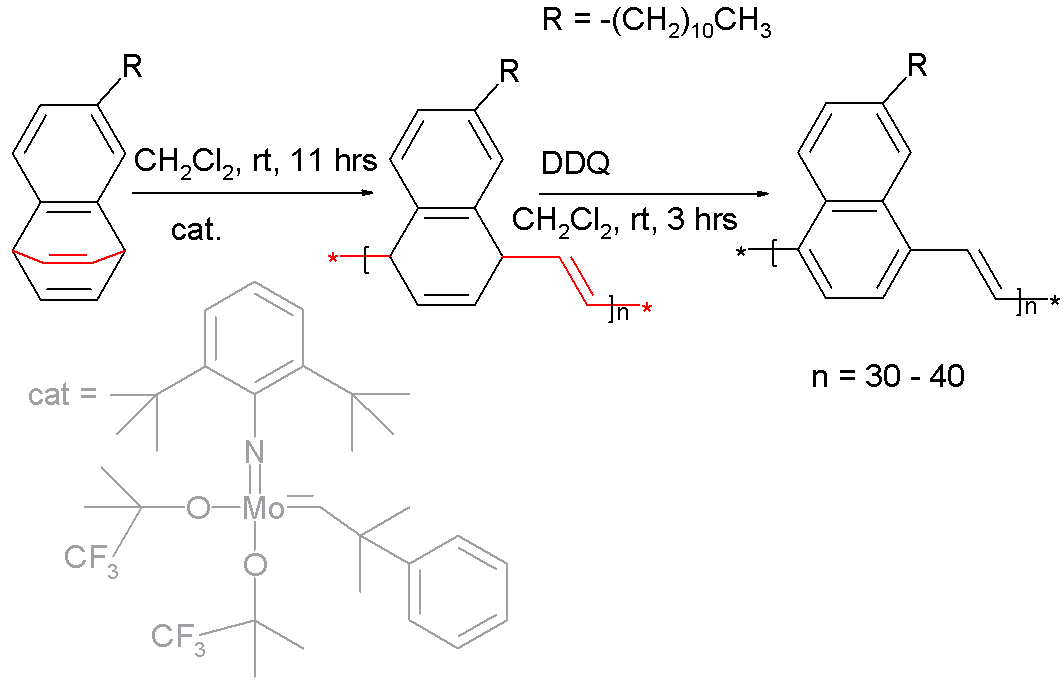

The catalyst is a Schrock carbene (a molybdenum bis-(hexafluoro-tert-butoxy) carbene catalyst) and the long alkyl chain attached to the monomer is required for solubility. Oxidation of the polymer with DDQ affords the naphthalene pendant of poly(p-phenylene vinylene).

Isopentane solutions of barrelene undergo photolytic isomerisation when acetone is added as a photosensitizer to produce semibullvalene. Prolonged irradiation results in further isomerisation to form cyclooctatetraene.
