= Pitrilysin =

Class of enzymes

Identifiers
- EC no.: 3.4.24.55
- CAS no.: 81611-78-1

Databases
- BRENDA: enzyme data
- ExPASy: NiceZyme view
- KEGG: enzyme entry
- MetaCyc: metabolic pathway
- Rhea: reactions
- PDB structures: RCSB PDB PDBe PDBsum
Search
- PMC: articles
- PubMed: articles
- NCBI: proteins

Pitrilysin (EC 3.4.24.55, Escherichia coli protease III, protease Pi, proteinase Pi, PTR, Escherichia coli metalloproteinase Pi) is an enzyme. This enzyme catalyses the following chemical reaction:

Preferential cleavage of -Tyr^{16}- Leu- and -Phe^{25}- Tyr-bonds of oxidized insulin B chain. Also acts on other substrates of less than 7 kDa such as glucagon

This enzyme is present in bacteria Escherichia coli.
