= Particle transfer roller =

The particle transfer roller, often abbreviated to PTR, is a device for cleaning motion picture film. It consists of a cylindrical roller coated with urethane, over which the surface of the film passes.

== History ==
The particle transfer roller was developed by Eastman Kodak and launched in 1989. It was intended to replace the organic solvents that were the main method of film cleaning before that point. Although their effectiveness is not usually considered sufficient for lab operations, where ultrasonic cleaning with a solvent solution remains the standard, the PTR sold widely for use in projection booths and transfer houses.

== Use ==
At least two PTRs are needed in the film path – one for the base side and one for the emulsion side – though four are frequently used. A set of PTRs is frequently placed in the film paths of projectors, telecine machines, scanners and printers in order to remove dust and contaminants from the surface of the film before projection, transfer or duplication. PTRs are also used in some dedicated film cleaning machines, or mounted between rewind heads and used for manual cleaning. The contaminants are lifted from the film and adhere to the roller as the film passes in contact with it. The rollers themselves are then cleaned, usually in soapy water, and dried before the next use.
