= Daily light integral =

Daily total of photosynthetic light per area

Daily light integral (DLI) describes the number of photosynthetically active photons (individual particles of light in the 400-700 nm range) that are delivered to a specific area over a 24-hour period. This variable is particularly useful to describe the light environment of plants.

== Formula ==
The equation for converting Photosynthetic Photon Flux Density (PPFD) to DLI, assuming constant PPFD, is below.

$\text{DLI}(\text{mol}/(\text{m}^2\cdot\text{day}) = 3.6\cdot 10^{-3} \cdot \text{PPFD}(\mu\text{mol}/(\text{m}^2\cdot\text{s})) \cdot \text{Light-hours} /\text{day}$

where
Light-hours is the number of hours in a day active photons are delivered to the target area, measured in hours.

Note that the factor 3.6·10^{−3} is due to the conversion factors coming from μmol being converted to mol and the unit of hours (from Light-Hours) being converted to seconds.

== Definition and units ==
The daily light integral (DLI) is the number of photosynthetically active photons (photons in the PAR range) accumulated in a square meter over the course of a day. It is a function of photosynthetic light intensity and duration (day length) and is usually expressed as moles of light (mol photons) per square meter (m^{−2}) per day (d^{−1}), or: mol·m^{−2}·d^{−1}.

DLI is usually calculated by measuring the photosynthetic photon flux density (PPFD) in μmol·m^{−2}·s^{−1} (number of photons in the PAR range received in a square meter per second) as it changes throughout the day, and then using that to calculate total estimated number of photons in the PAR range received over a 24-hour period for a specific area. In other words, DLI describes the sum of the per second PPFD measurements during a 24-hour period.

If the photosynthetic light intensity stays the same for the entire 24-hour period, DLI in mol m^{−2} d^{−1} can be estimated from the instantaneous PPFD from the following equation: μmol m^{−2} s^{−1} multiplied by 86,400 (number of seconds in a day) and divided by 10^{6} (number of μmol in a mol). Thus, 1 μmol m^{−2} s^{−1} = 0.0864 mol m^{−2} d^{−1} if light intensity stays the same for the entire 24 hour period.

== Rationale for using DLI ==
In the past, biologists have used lux or energy meters to quantify light intensity. They switched to using PPFD when it was realized that the flux of photons in the 400-700 nm range is the important factor in driving the photosynthetic process. However, PPFD is usually expressed as the photon flux per second. This is a convenient time scale when measuring short-term changes in photosynthesis in gas exchange systems, but falls short when the light climate for plant growth has to be characterized. First because it does not take into account the length of the day light period, but foremost because light intensity in the field or in glasshouses changes so much diurnally and from day to day. Scientists have tried to solve this by reporting light intensity measured for one or more sunny days at noon, but this is grasping the light level for only a very short period of the day. Daily light integral includes both the diurnal variation and day length, and can also be reported as a mean value per month or over an entire experiment. It has been shown to be better related to plant growth and morphology than PPFD at any moment or day length alone. Some energy meters are able to capture PPFD during an interval period such as 24-hours.

== Normal ranges ==
Outdoors, DLI values vary depending on latitude, time of year, and cloud cover. Occasionally, values over 70 mol·m^{−2}·d^{−1} can be reached at bright summer days at some locations. Monthly-averaged DLI values range between 20-40 in the tropics, 15-60 at 30° latitude and 1-40 at 60° latitude. For plants growing in the shade of taller plants, such as on the forest floor, DLI may be less than 1 mol·m^{−2}·d^{−1}, even in summer.

In greenhouses, 30-70% of the outside light will be absorbed or reflected by the glass and other greenhouse structures. DLI levels in greenhouses therefore rarely exceed 30 mol·m^{−2}·d^{−1}. In growth chambers, values between 10 and 30 mol·m^{−2}·d^{−1} are most common. New light modules are now available for the horticultural industry, where light intensity of the lamps used in glasshouses is regulated such that plants receive a set value of DLI, independent of outside weather conditions.

== Effects on plants ==
DLI affects many plant traits. Generalised dose-response curves show that DLI is particularly limiting individual plant growth and functioning below 5 mol·m^{−2}·d^{−1}, whereas most traits approach saturation beyond a DLI of 20 mol·m^{−2}·d^{−1}. Although not all plants respond in the same way and different wavelengths have various effects, a range of general trends are found:

=== Leaf anatomy ===
High light increases leaf thickness, either because of an increase in the number of cell layers within the leaf, and/or because of an increase in the cell size within a cell layer. The density of a leaf increases as well, and so does the leaf dry mass per area (LMA). There are also more stomata per mm2.

=== Leaf chemical composition ===
Taken over all species and experiments, high light does not affect the organic nitrogen concentration, but decreases the concentration of chlorophyll and minerals. It increases the concentration of starch and sugars, soluble phenolics, and also the xanthophyll/chlorophyll ratio and the chlorophyll a/b ratio.

=== Leaf physiology ===
While the chlorophyll concentration decreases, leaves have more leaf mass per unit leaf area, and as a result the chlorophyll content per unit leaf area is relatively unaffected. This is also true for the light absorptance of a leaf. Leaf light reflectance goes up and leaf light transmittance goes down. Per unit leaf area there is more RuBisCO and a higher photosynthetic rate under light-saturated conditions. Expressed per unit leaf dry mass, however, photosynthetic capacity decreases.

=== Plant growth ===
Plants growing at high light invest less of their biomass in leaves and stems, and more in roots. They grow faster, per unit leaf area (ULR) and per unit total plant mass (RGR), and therefore high-light grown plants generally have more biomass. They have shorter internodes, with more stem biomass per unit stem length, but plant height is often not strongly affected. High-light plants do show more branches or tillers.

=== Plant reproduction ===
High-light grown plants generally have somewhat larger seeds, but produce many more flowers, and therefore there is a large increase in seed production per plant. Sturdy plants with short internodes and many flowers are important for horticulture, and hence a minimum amount of DLI is required for marketable horticultural plants. Measuring DLI over a growing season and comparing it to results can help determine which varieties of plants will thrive in a specific location.

== See also ==
- Grow light
- Photosynthesis
- PI curve
