= Overheating (electricity) =

Elevated temperature in an electric circuit

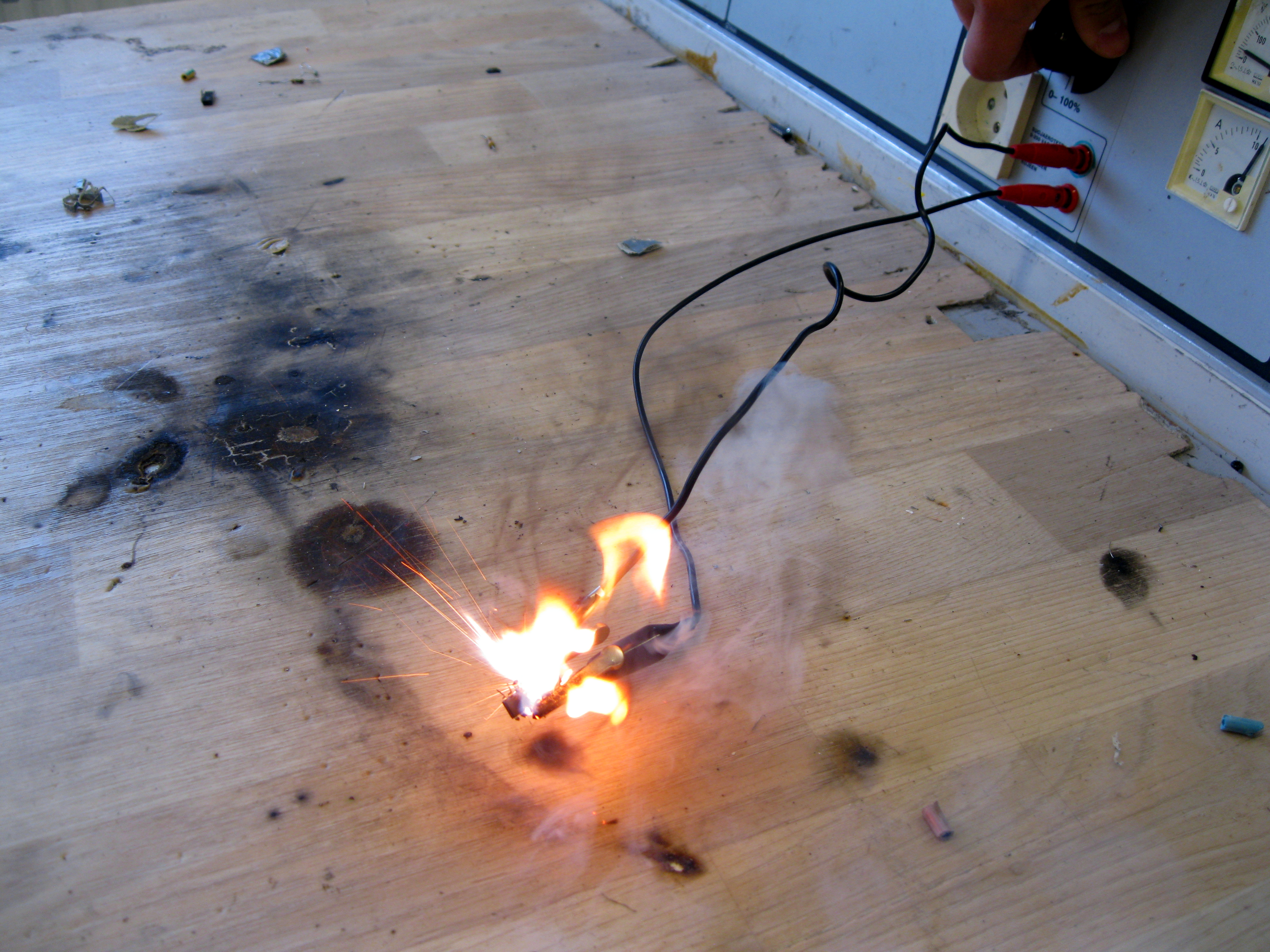
Integrated circuit explodes.

Overheating is a phenomenon of rising temperatures in an electrical circuit. Overheating causes damage to the circuit components and can cause fire, explosion, and injury. Damage caused by overheating is usually irreversible; the only way to repair it is to replace some components.

== Causes ==
When overheating, the temperature of the part rises above the operating temperature. Overheating can take place:

- if heat is produced in more than expected amount (such as in cases of short-circuits, or applying more voltage than rated), or
- if heat dissipation is poor, so that normally produced waste heat does not drain away properly.

Overheating may be caused from any accidental fault of the circuit (such as short-circuit or spark-gap), or may be caused from a wrong design or manufacture (such as the lack of a proper heat dissipation system). Due to accumulation of heat, the system reaches an equilibrium of heat accumulation vs. dissipation at a much higher temperature than expected.

== Preventive measures ==
=== Use of circuit breaker or fuse ===
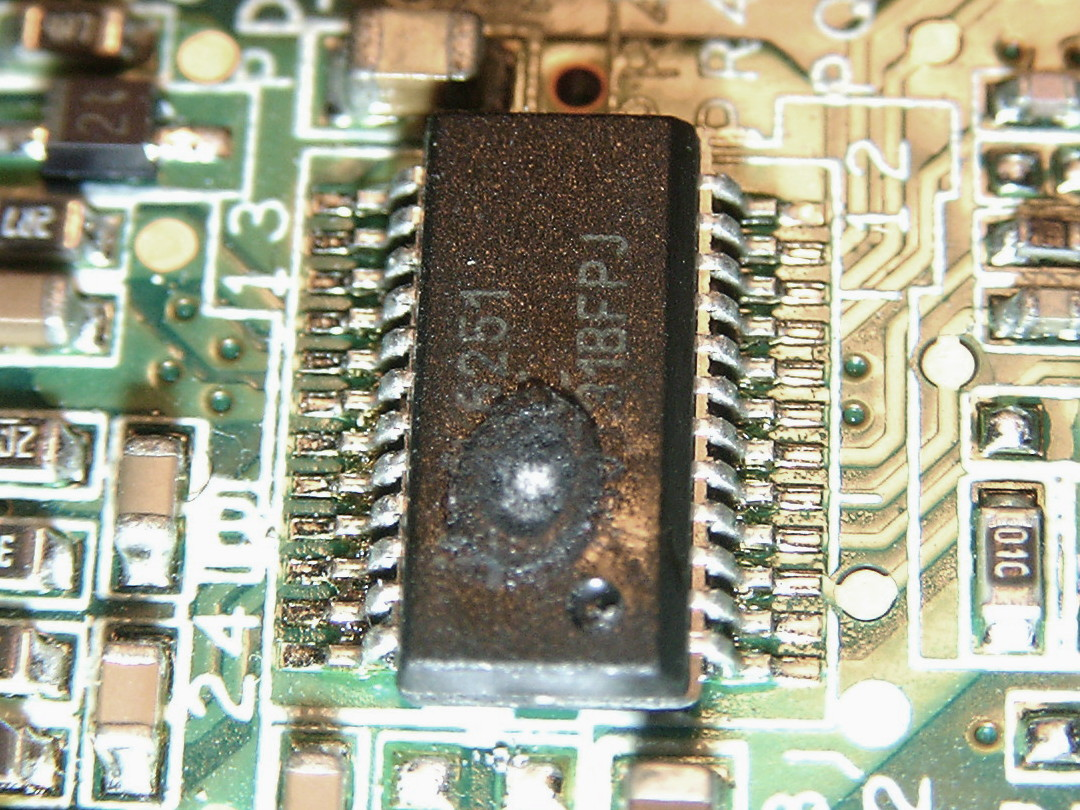
Failed IC in a laptop. Wrong input voltage has caused massive overheating of the chip and melted the plastic casing.

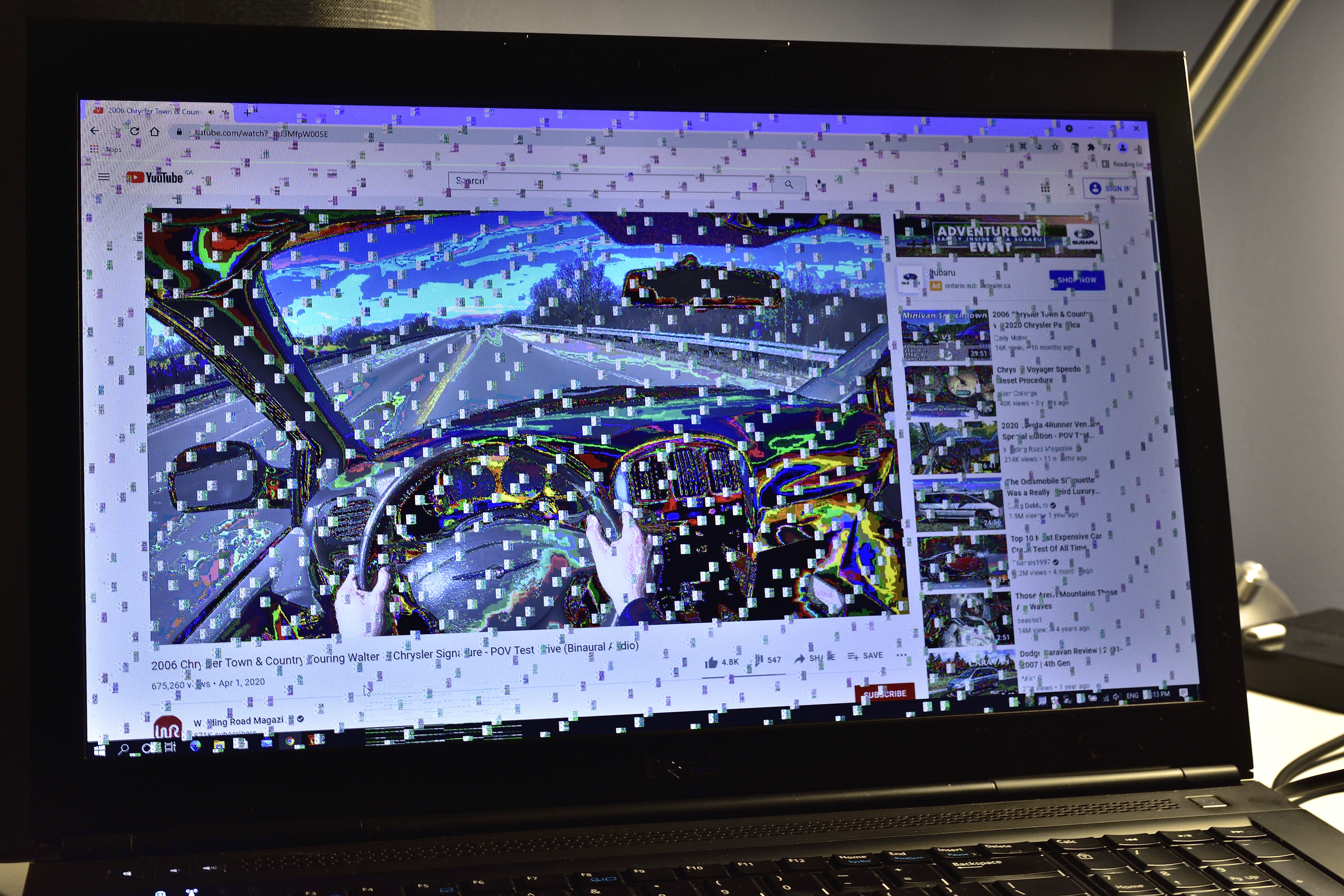
Glitched and garbled display on a workstation laptop with a defective graphics card that underwent extensive overheating from use in a hot environment.

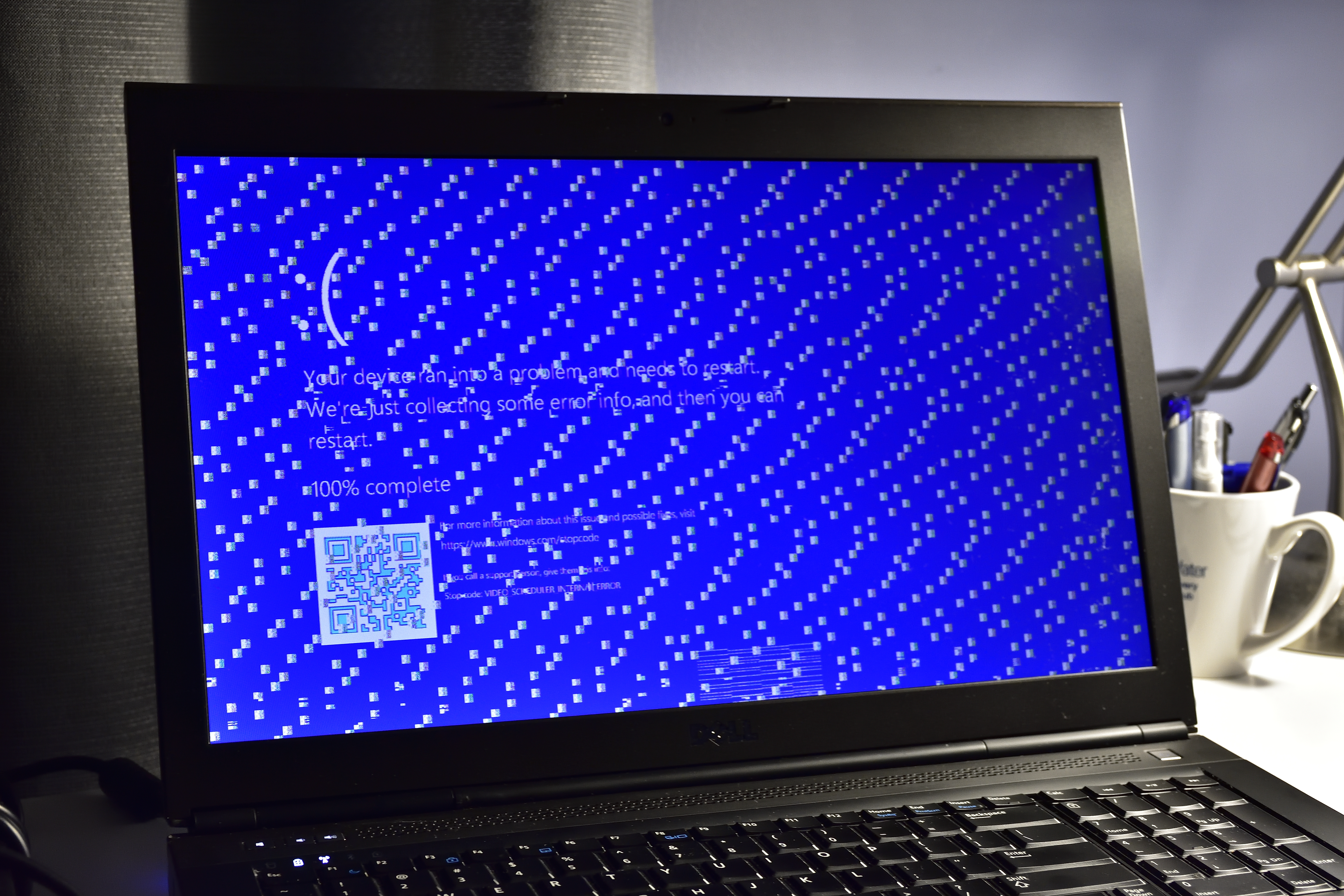
The same laptop failing to operate properly due to the aforementioned graphics card defect, crashing the operating system and displaying a blue screen of death (albeit with graphical artifacts) on the screen.

Circuit-breakers can be placed at portions of a circuit in series to the path of current it will affect. If more current than expected goes through the circuit-breaker, the circuit breaker "opens" the circuit and stops all current. A fuse is a common type of circuit breaker that involves the direct effect of Joule heating. A fuse is always placed in series with the path of current it will affect. Fuses usually consist of a thin strand of wire. When more than the rated current flows through the fuse, the wire melts and breaks the circuit.

=== Use of heat-dissipating systems ===
Many systems use ventilation holes or slits kept on the box of equipment to dissipate heat. Heat sinks are often attached to portions of the circuit that produce most heat or are vulnerable to heat. Fans are also often used. Some high-voltage instruments are kept immersed in oil. In some cases, to remove unwanted heat, a cooling system like air conditioning or refrigerating heat-pumps may be required.

=== Control within circuit-design ===
Sometimes, special circuits are built for the purpose of sensing and controlling the temperature or voltage status. Devices such as thermistors, voltage-dependent resistors, thermostats and sensors such as infrared thermometers are used to modify the current upon different conditions such as circuit-temperature and input voltage.

=== Proper manufacture ===
For certain purposes in an item of electrical equipment or a portion of it, definite type and size of materials with proper rating for voltage, current and temperature, are used. The circuit resistance never kept too low. Sometimes some parts placed inside the board and box, maintaining a proper distance from each other, to avoid heat damage and short-circuit damage. To prevent short circuit, appropriate types of electrical connectors and mechanical fasteners are used.

== Gallery ==
Gallery: Circuit breakers and fuses used to stop current.
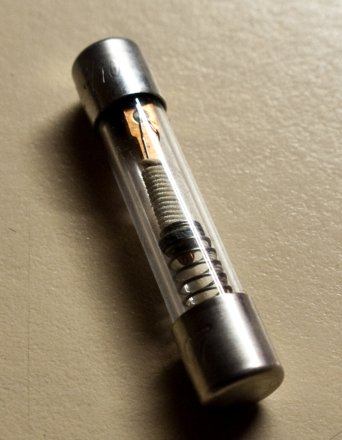
Miniature time-delay fuse to interrupt 0.3 A current at 250 V after 100 s, and 15 A current at 250 V in 0.1 s

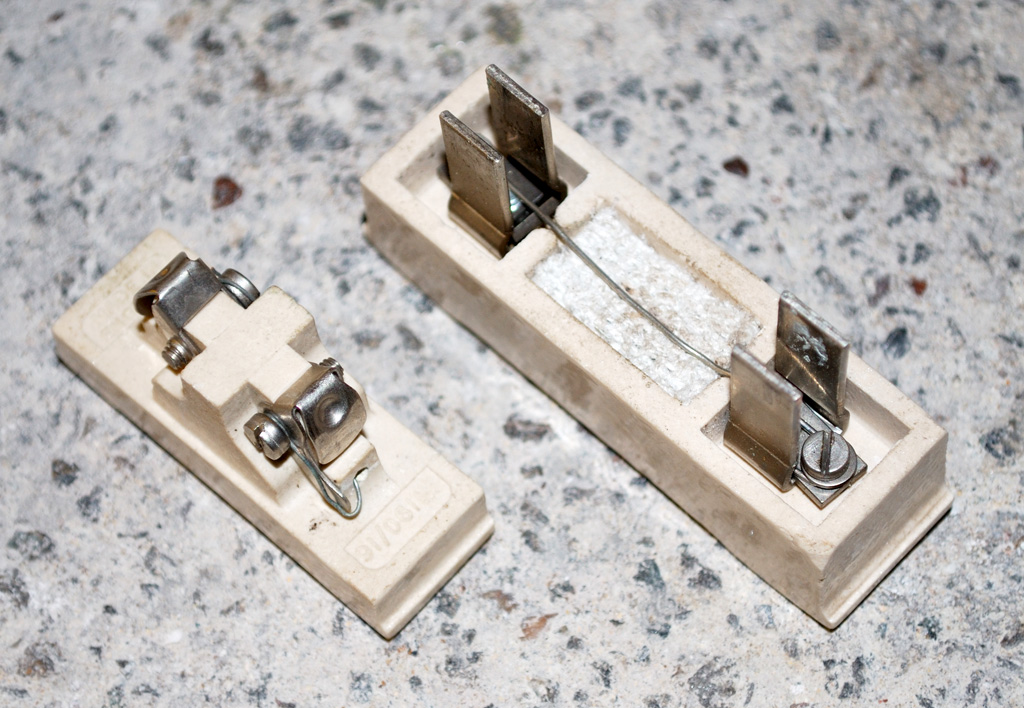
MEM rewirable fuse holders (30 A and 15 A)

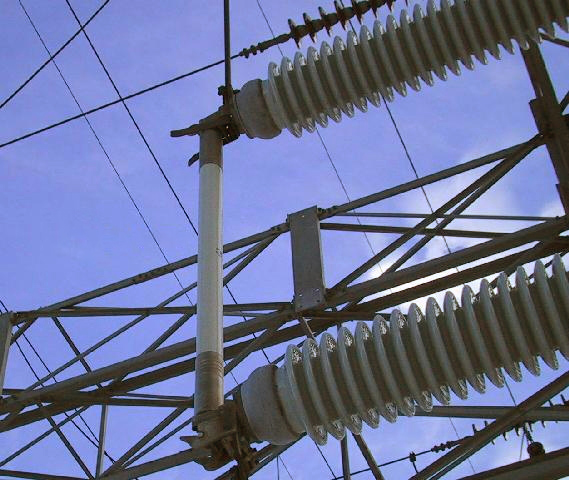
A 115 kV high-voltage fuse near a hydroelectric power plant
Gallery: Methods of improving heat dissipation from equipment
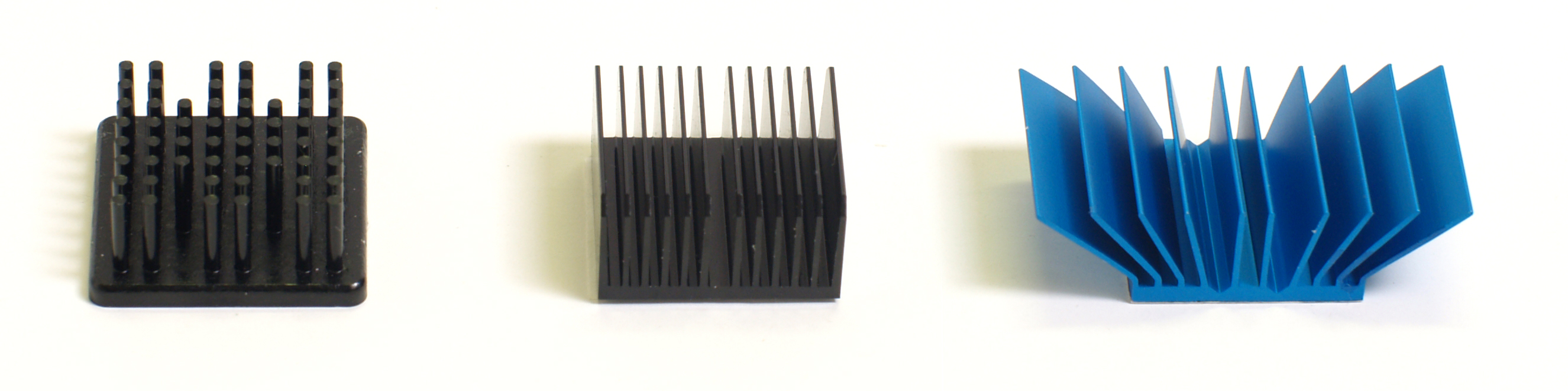
Pin-, straight- and flared-fin heat sink types

Animated diagram of a pin fin heat sink with thermal profile and air flow movement

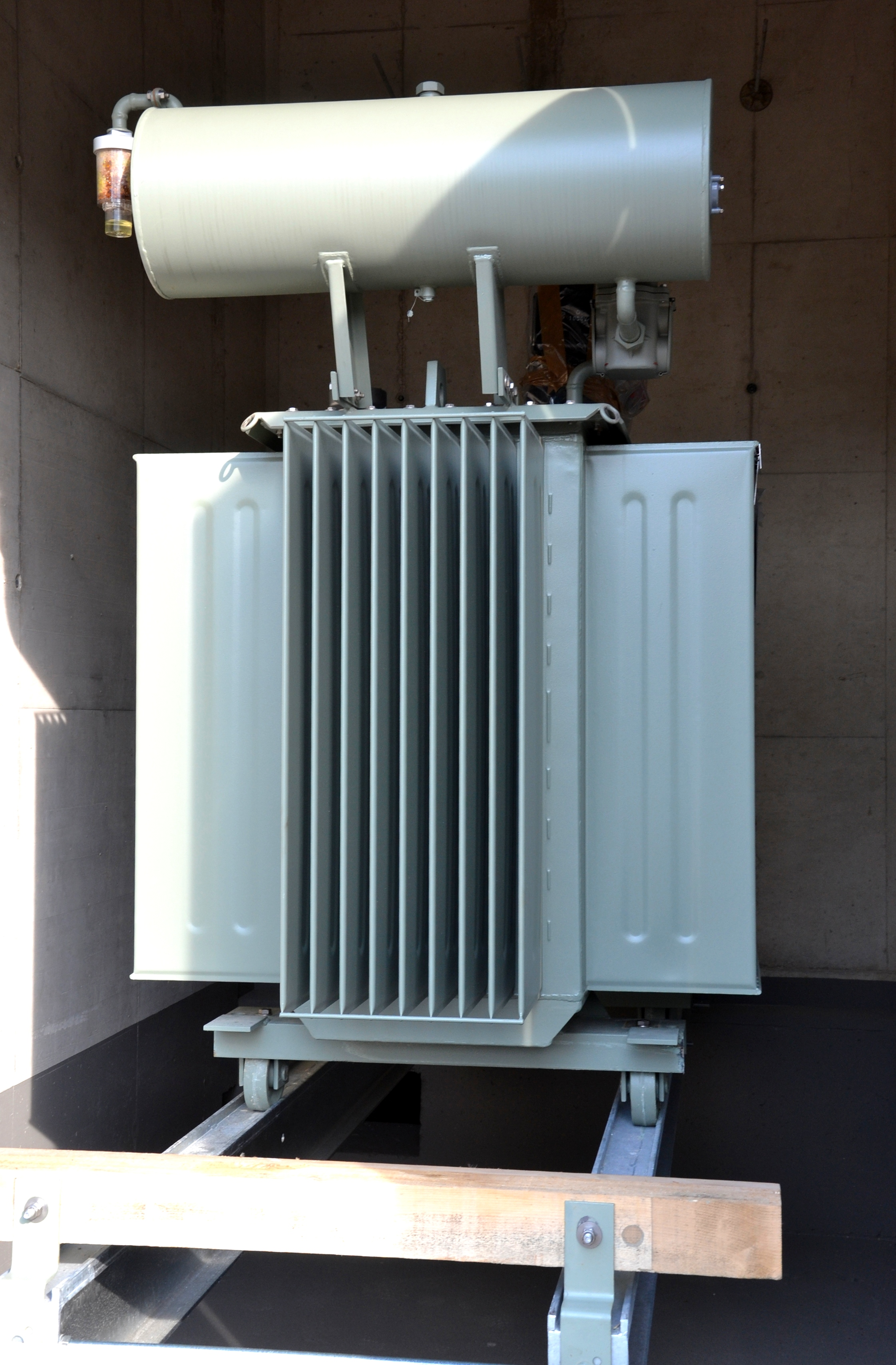
Oil transformer with air convection cooled heat exchangers

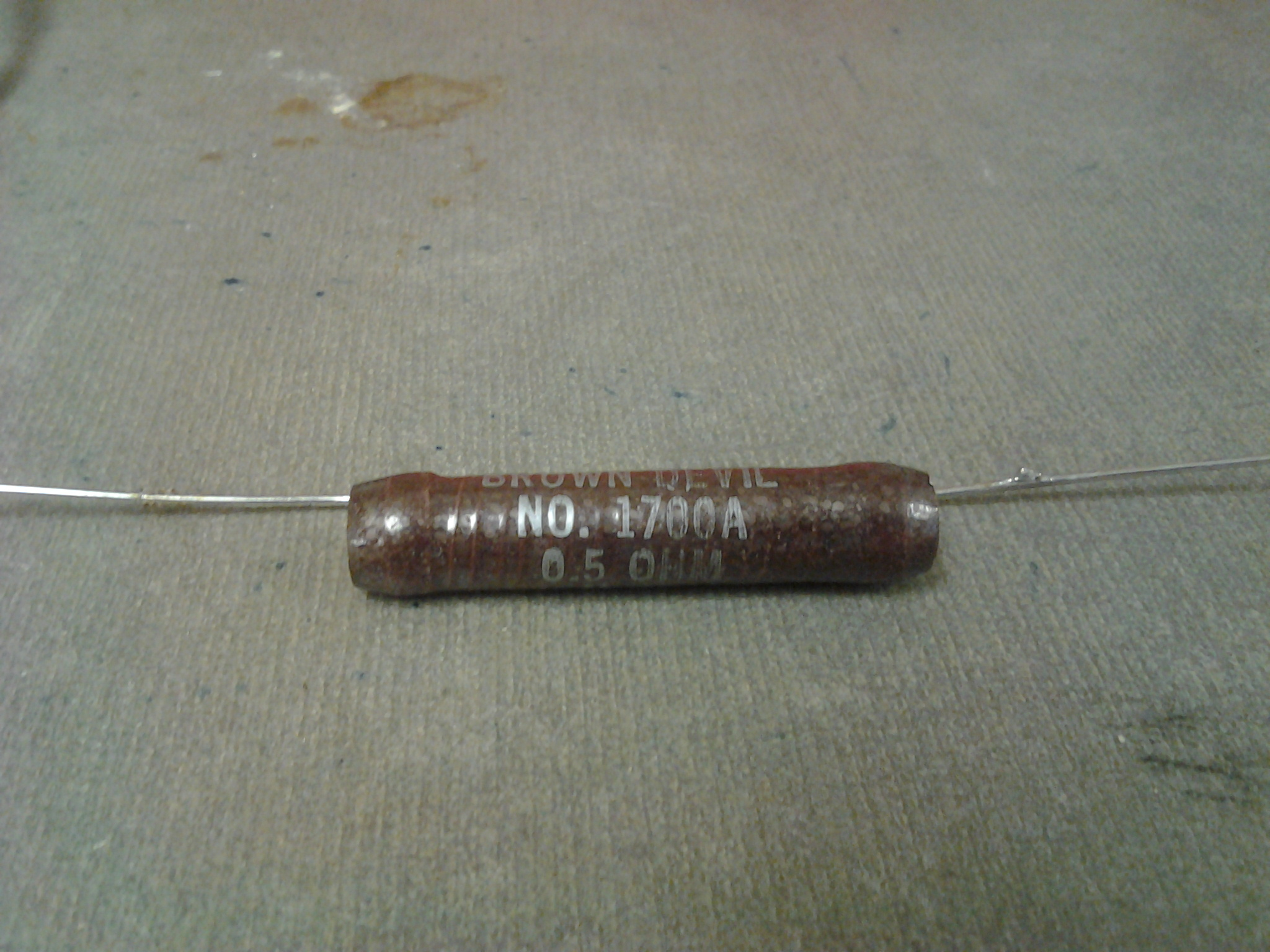
Power resistor
Gallery: Control of temperature with special mechanisms in circuits
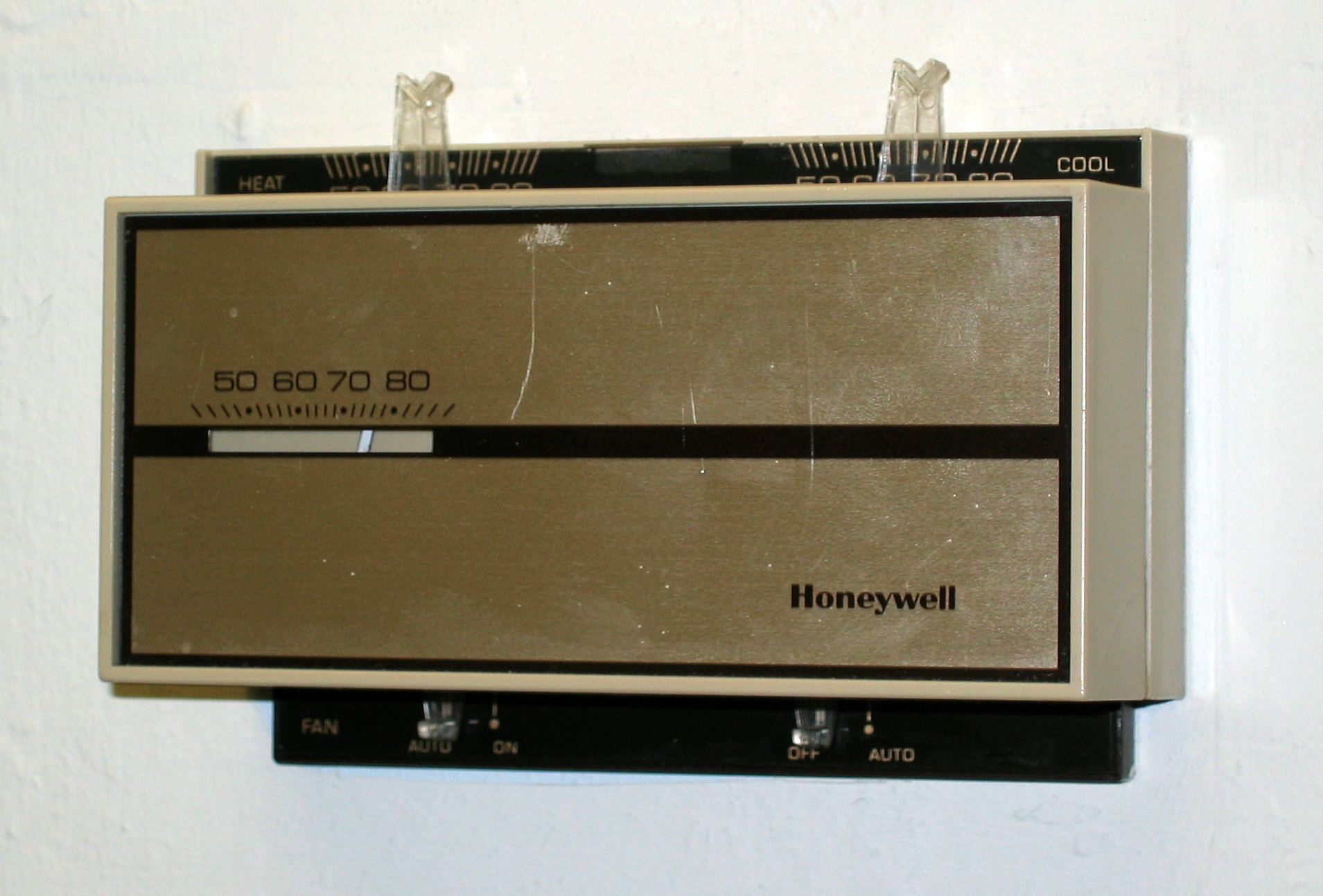
Bimetallic thermostat for buildings

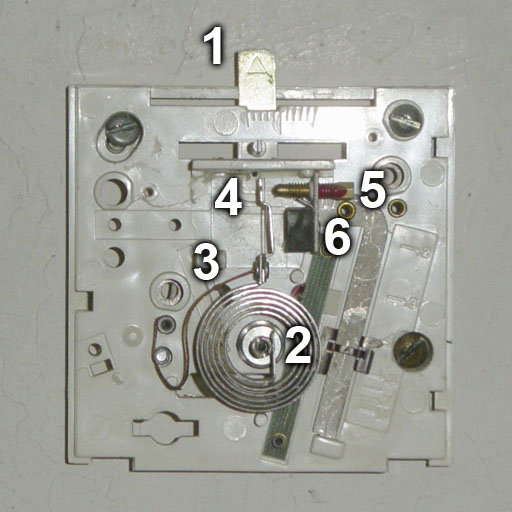
Millivolt thermostat interior mechanism

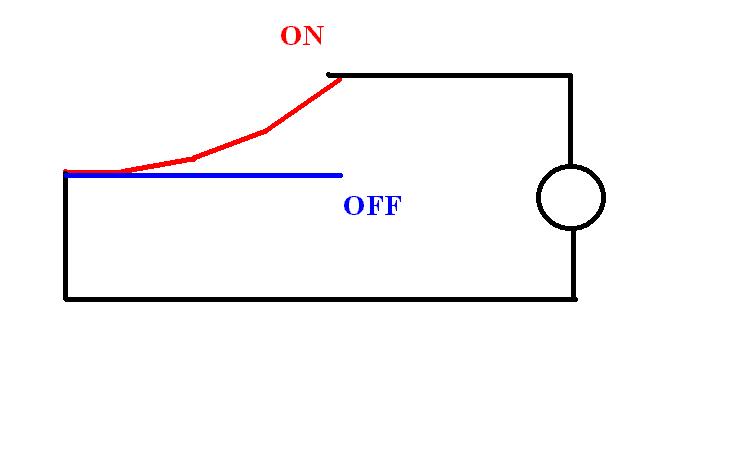
Bimetallic strip-thermostat working principle schematic

Animation of the working principle of a bimetallic strip

Bimetal coil reacts to lighter

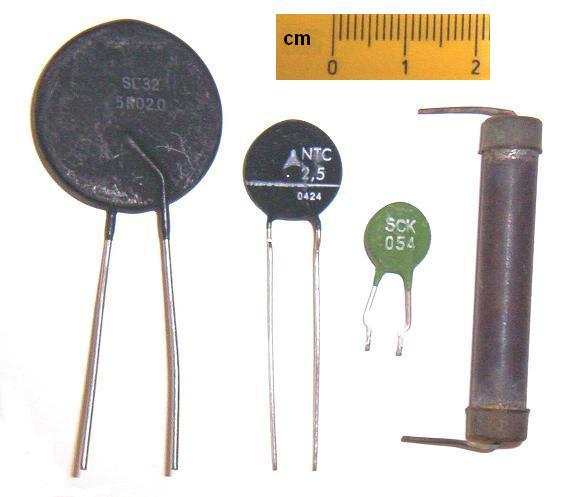
Three thermistors and an URDOX resistor.

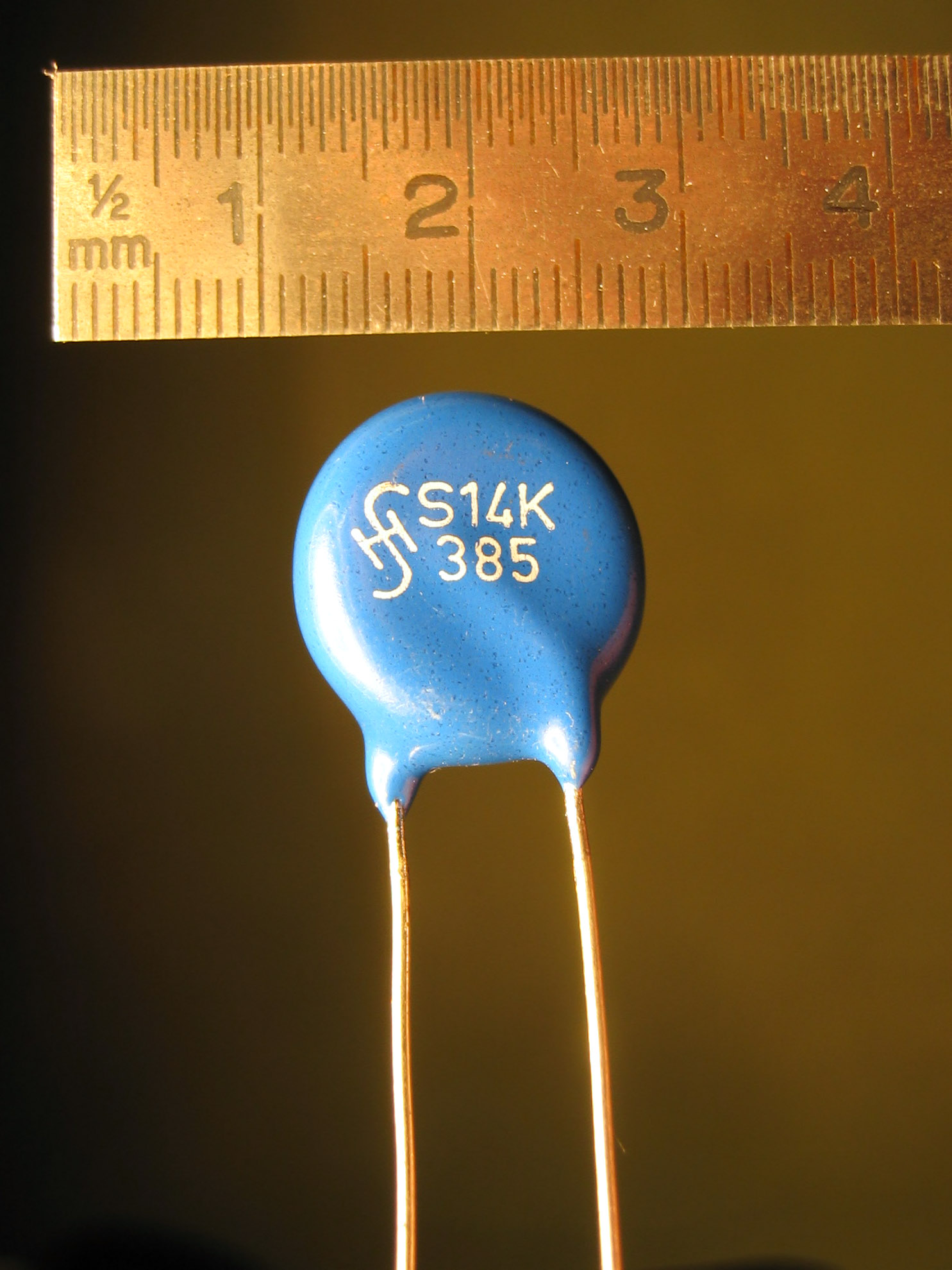
Metal-oxide varistor (voltage-dependent resistor)

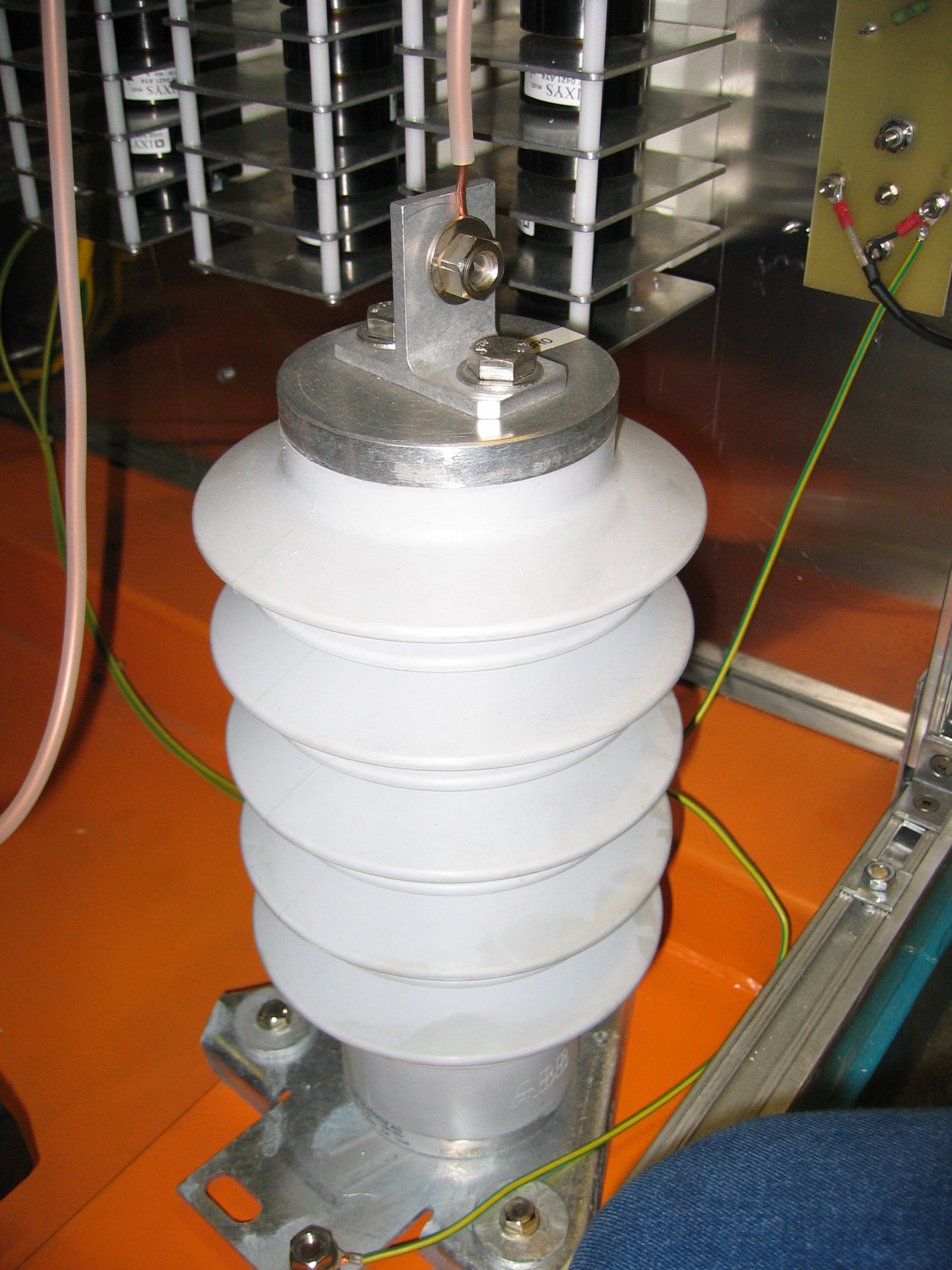
High voltage varistor

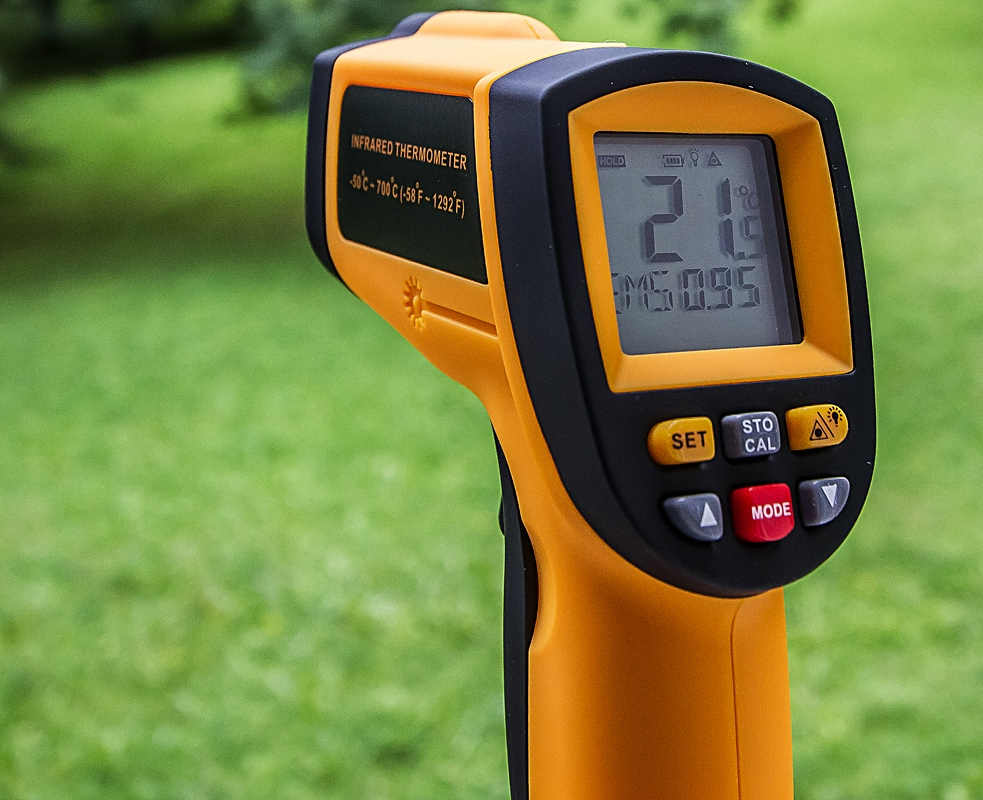
An infrared thermometer
Gallery: some causes, effects, and cause-effect loops for overheating
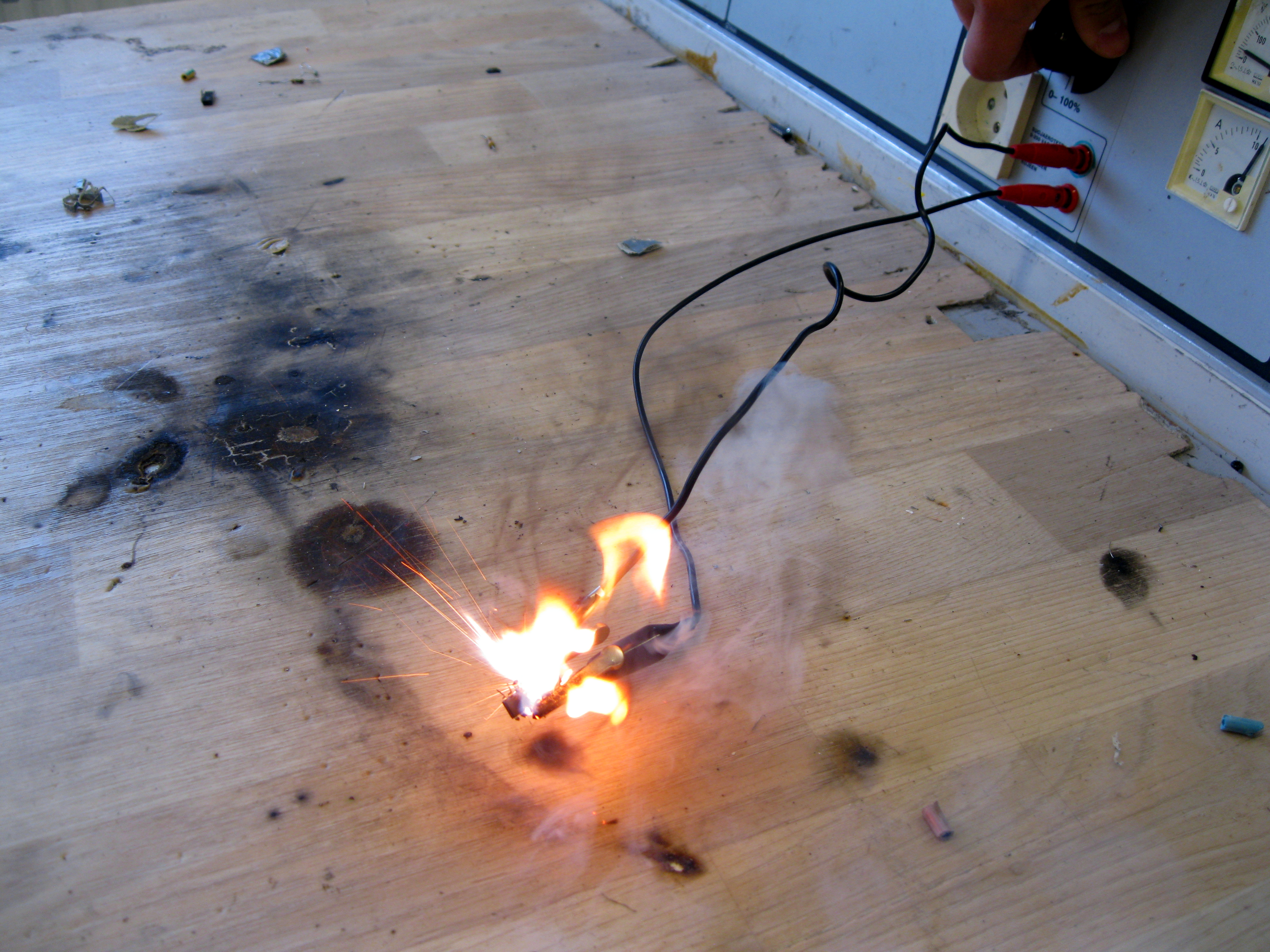
A short circuit caused by overvoltage destroys an integrated circuit.

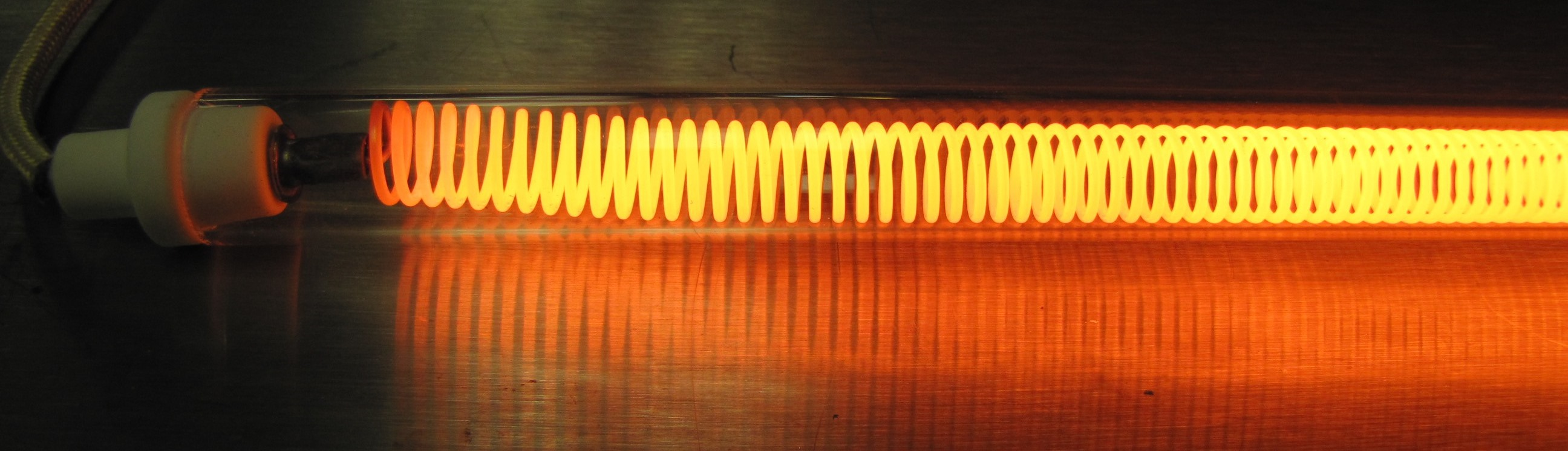
Joule heating or resistive heating is sometimes helpful such as in a heating coil. But Joule heating occurs, to some extent, in all the conductive parts of a circuit.

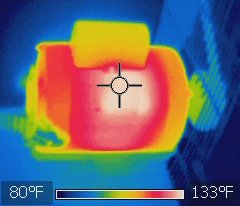
Infrared-thermal image of a motor

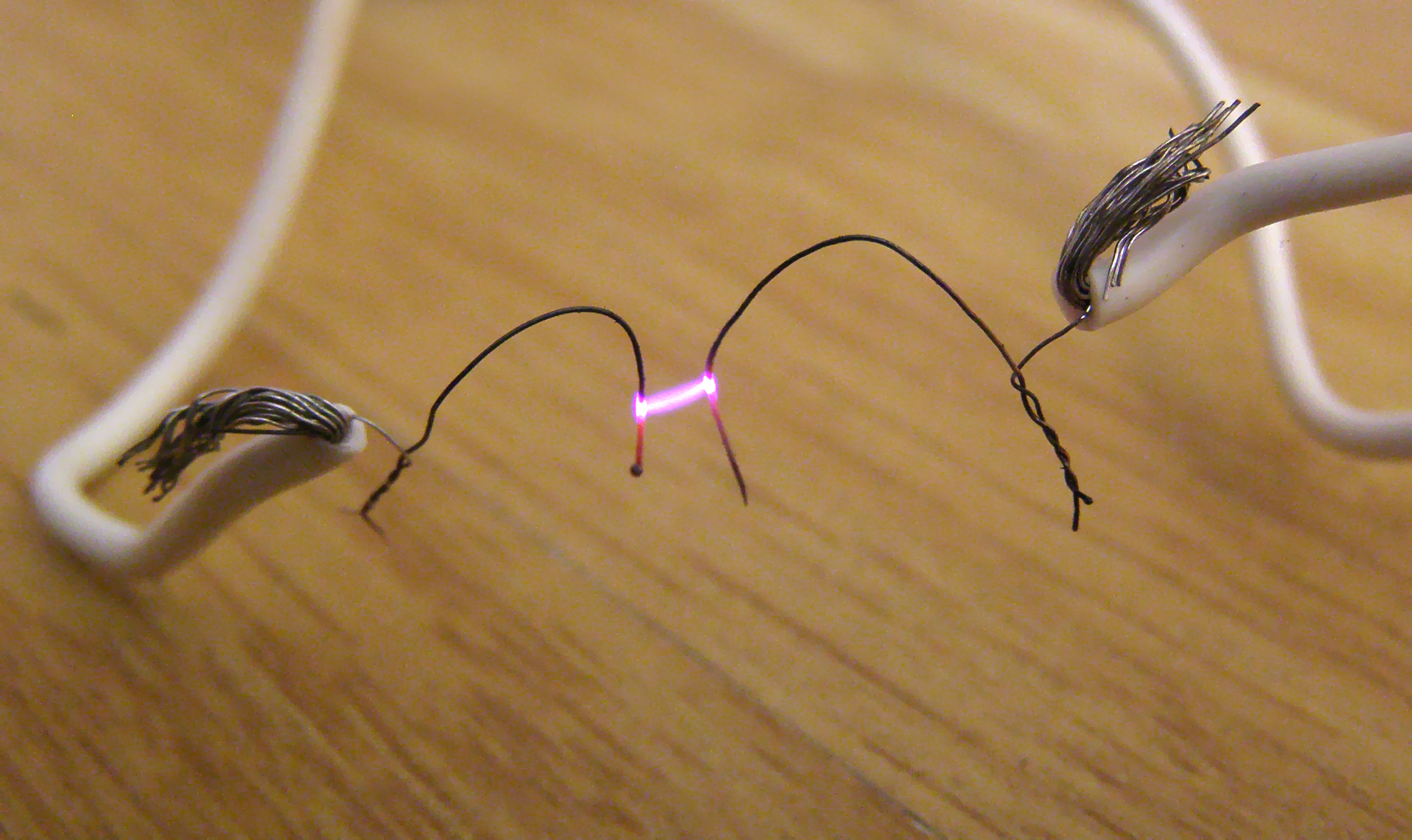
Electric arc (spark) between two wires. This can cause overheating and ignition.

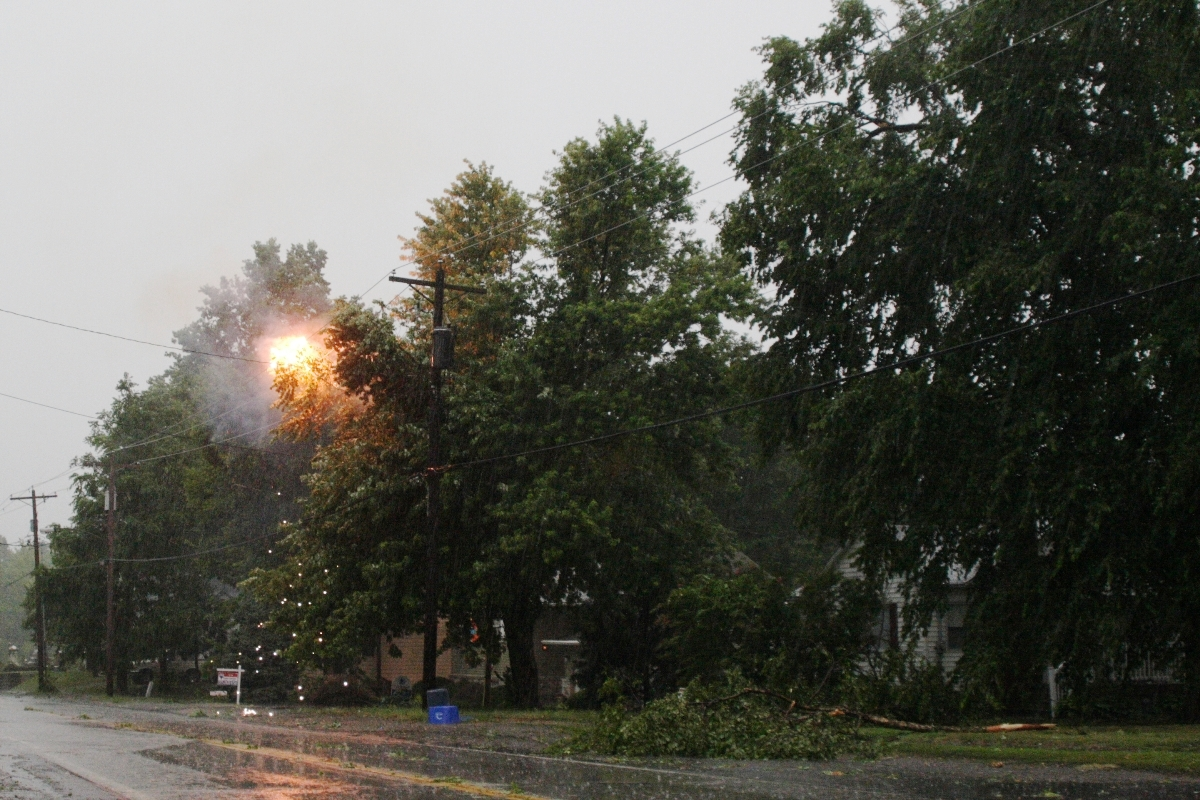
On un-insulated wires, trees facilitated short-circuit in storms.

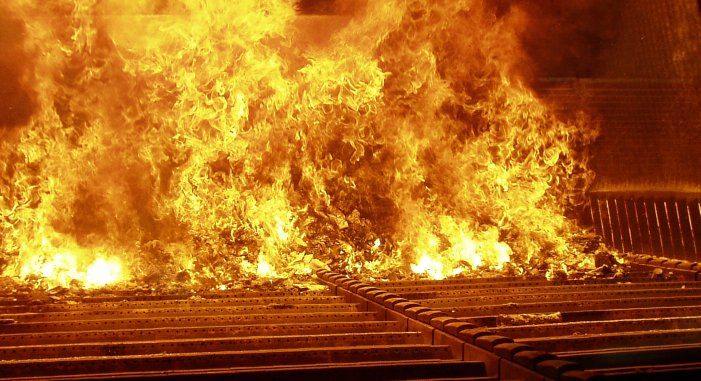
Ignition inside an incinerator caused by electricity, in this case deliberate. The same could happen in a circuit or building.

== See also ==
- Active cooling
- Air-cooling with fan
- Blue screen of death
- Computer cooling
- Conflagration
- Coolant
- Hang (computing)
- Heat exchanger
- Heat pipe
- Heat pump
- Heat sink
- Heat spreader
- Lithium-ion battery § Safety
- Oil cooling
- Radiator
- Thermal design power
- Thermal management of electronic devices and systems
- Thermal management of high-power LEDs
- Thermal resistance in electronics
- Thermal runaway
- Thermoelectric cooling
- Transformer oil
- Wire gauge
