= Thermal management =

Thermal management can mean:

- Thermal management (electronics)
- Thermal management of high-power LEDs
- Thermal management of spacecraft
- Exhaust heat management of internal combustion engines
- Thermoregulation in biological organisms
- Thermostat, a thermal control and management device for heating and cooling systems
- Thermal management technologies, a project of the Microsystems Technology Office division of DARPA
