= LED filament =

LED lamp with visible filaments

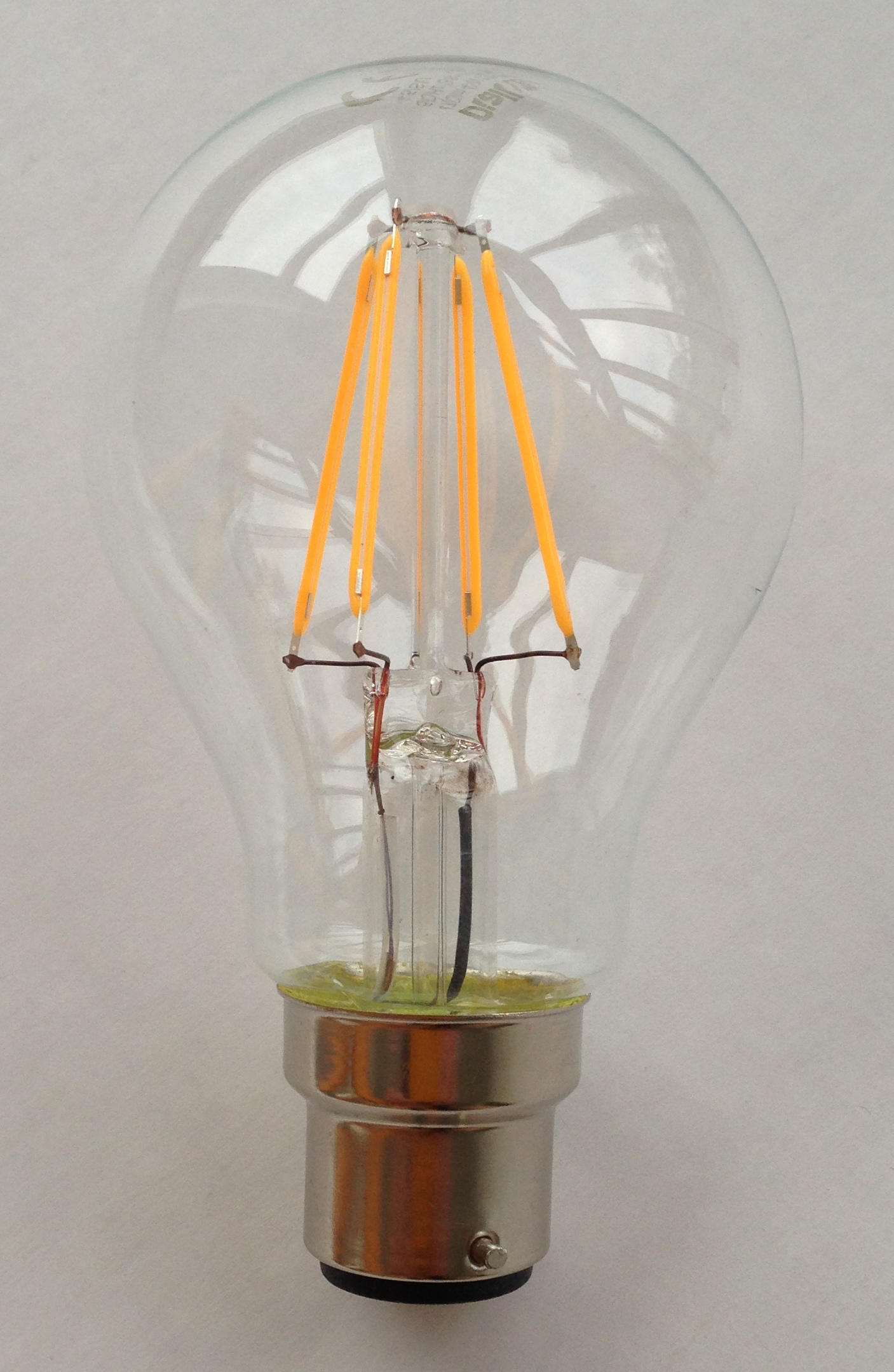
A 230-volt LED filament light bulb, with a B22 base. The filaments are visible as the four yellow vertical lines.

A LED filament light bulb is a LED lamp which is designed to resemble a traditional incandescent light bulb with visible filaments for aesthetic and light distribution purposes, but with the high efficiency of light-emitting diodes (LEDs). The name comes from their strings of many close-spaced series-connected diodes, which resemble the filaments of incandescent light bulbs much closer than previous bulbs with many LEDs. They are made as direct replacements for conventional incandescent bulbs, as they are made in the same shapes, they use the same bases that fit the same sockets, and they work at the same supply voltage. They may be used for their appearance, similar when lit to a clear incandescent bulb, or for their wide angle of light distribution, typically 300°. They are also more efficient than many other LED lamps.

== History ==
Structure of a typical filament

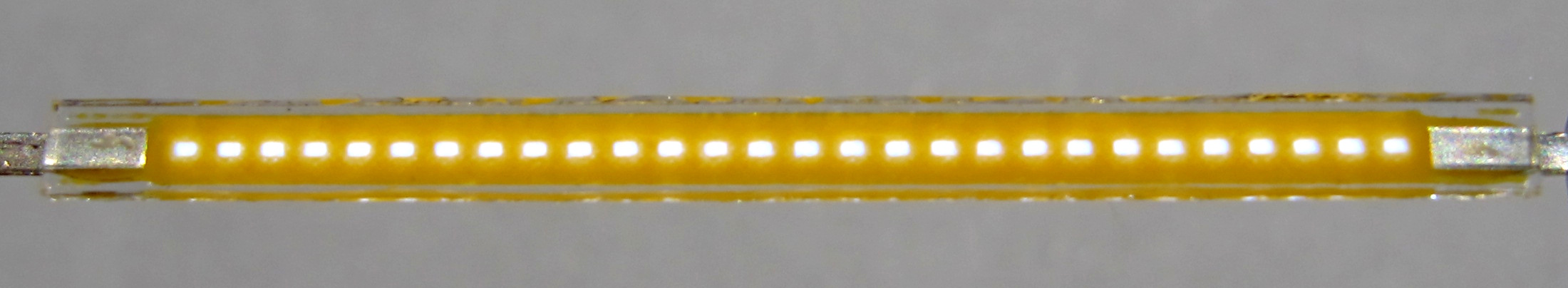
Closeup of a filament at 5% power, showing the individual LED light spots.

A LED filament type design light bulb was produced by Ushio Lighting in 2008, intended to mimic the appearance of a standard light bulb. Contemporary bulbs typically used a single large LED or matrix of LEDs attached to one large heatsink. As a consequence, these bulbs typically produced a beam only 180 degrees wide. By about 2015, LED filament bulbs had been introduced by several manufacturers. These designs used several LED filament light emitters, similar in appearance when lit to the filament of a clear, standard incandescent bulb, and very similar in detail to the multiple filaments of the early Edison incandescent bulbs.

LED filament bulbs were patented by Ushio and Sanyo in 2008. Panasonic described a flat arrangement with modules similar to filaments in 2013. Two other independent patent applications were filed in 2014 but were never granted. The early filed patents included a heat drain under the LEDs. At that time, luminous efficacy of LEDs was under 100 lm/W. By the late 2010s, this had risen to near 160 lm/W.

== Design ==
The LED filament consists of multiple series-connected LEDs on a transparent substrate, referred to as chip-on-glass (COG). These transparent substrates are made of glass or sapphire materials. This transparency allows the emitted light to disperse evenly and uniformly without any interference. An even coating of yellow phosphor in a silicone resin binder material converts the blue light generated by the LEDs into light approximating white light of the desired colour temperature—typically 2700 K to match the warm white of an incandescent bulb. Degradation of silicone binder and leakage of blue light are design issues in LED filament lights.

A benefit of the filament design is potentially higher efficiency due to the use of more LED emitters with lower driving currents. A major benefit of the design is the ease with which near full "global" (360°) illumination can be obtained from arrays of filaments, but two zones emitting less light appear diagonal to the substrate.

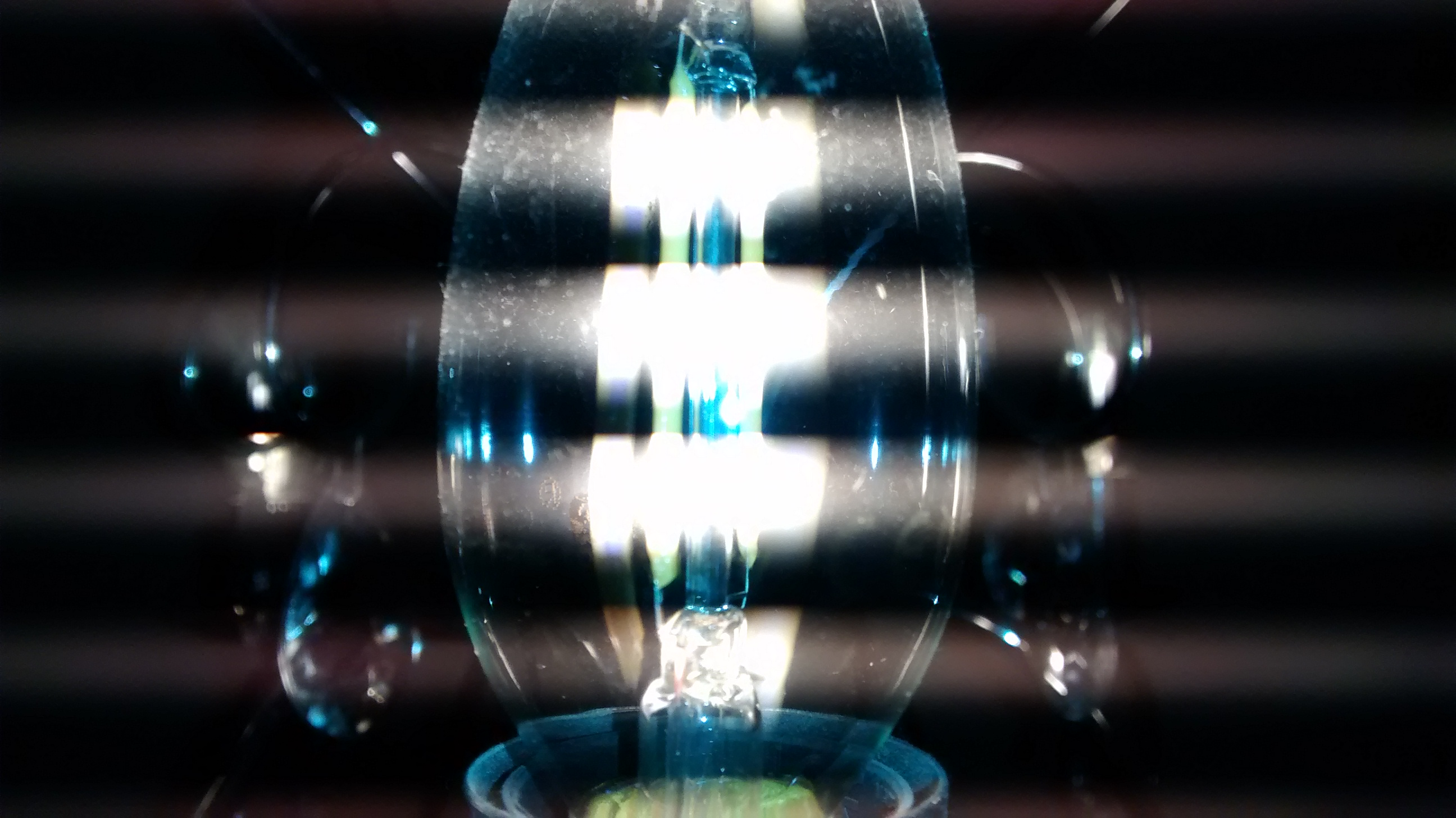
Flickering of dimmable filament LED lamp as interference with a digital camera frame rate

The lifespan of LED emitters is reduced by high operating temperatures. LED filament bulbs have many smaller, lower-power LED chips than other types, avoiding the need for a heatsink, but they must still pay attention to thermal management; multiple heat-dissipation paths are needed for reliable operation. The lamp may contain a high-thermal-conductivity gas (helium) blend to better conduct heat from the LED filament to the glass bulb. The LED filaments can be arranged to optimize heat dissipation. The life expectancy of the LED chips correlates to the junction temperature (Tj); light output falls faster with time at higher junction temperatures. Achieving a 30,000 hour life expectancy while maintaining 90% luminous flux requires the junction temperature to be maintained below 85 °C. LED filaments can burn out quickly if the controlled gas fill is ever lost for any reason.

The power supply in a clear bulb must be very small to fit into the base of the lamp. The large number of LEDs (typically 28 per filament) simplifies the power supply compared to other LED lamps, as the voltage per blue LED is between 2.48 and 3.7 volts DC. Some types may additionally use red LEDs (1.63 V= to 2.03 V=). Two filaments with a mix of red and blue is thus close to 110 V=, and four are close to 220–240 V=, compared to the mains AC voltage reduction to between 3 V= and 12 V= needed for other LED lamps. Four filaments are usually used, and the appearance is similar to an overrun carbon filament lamp. Typically, a mix of phosphors is used to give a higher color rendering index (as distinct from color temperature) than the early blue LEDs with yellow phosphor. Eight filaments at ~10 V and Twelve filaments at ~15 use capacitors to lower quantity and increase to longevity of 25,000 hours [obscure]; these models, made by Philips, are only available in the UAE.

The simple linear regulator used by some cheaper bulbs will cause some flickering at twice the frequency of the mains alternating current, which can be difficult to detect, but possibly contributes to eyestrain and headaches.

== Gallery ==
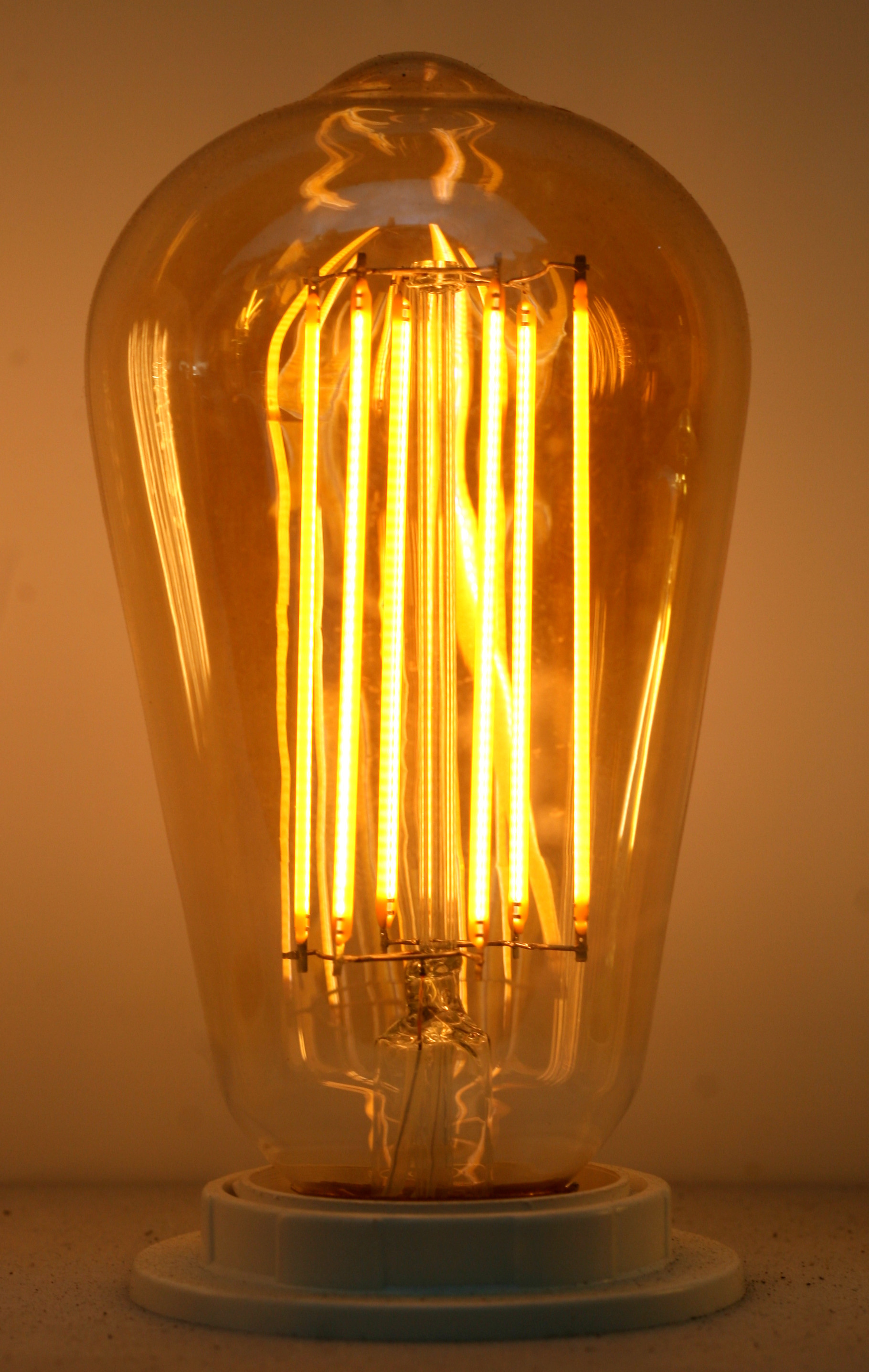
A LED filament bulb with an amber-colored glass shell and many filaments for better visual effects

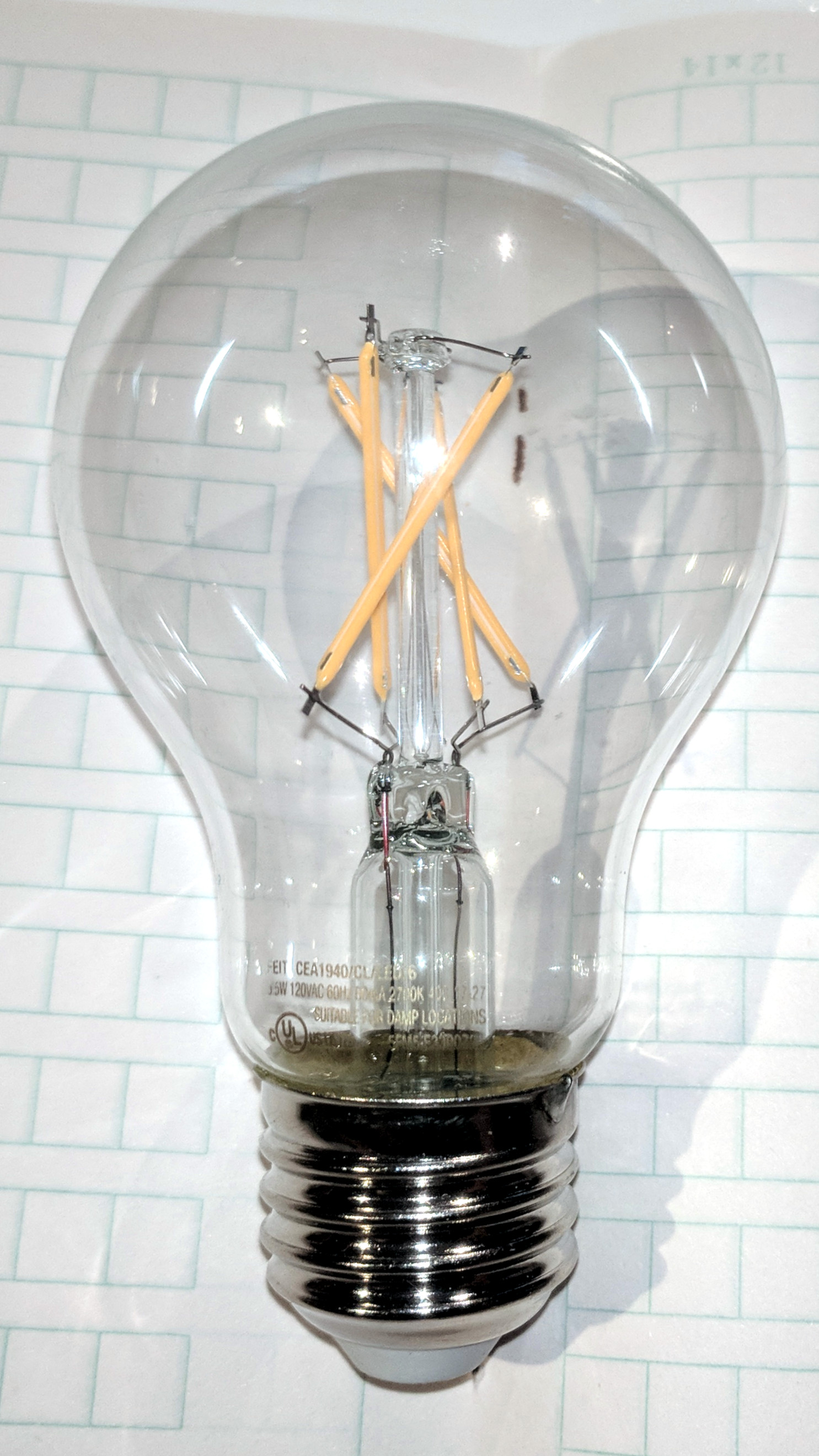
Filaments arranged in a criss-cross pattern to reduce shadows and provide a more uniform illumination

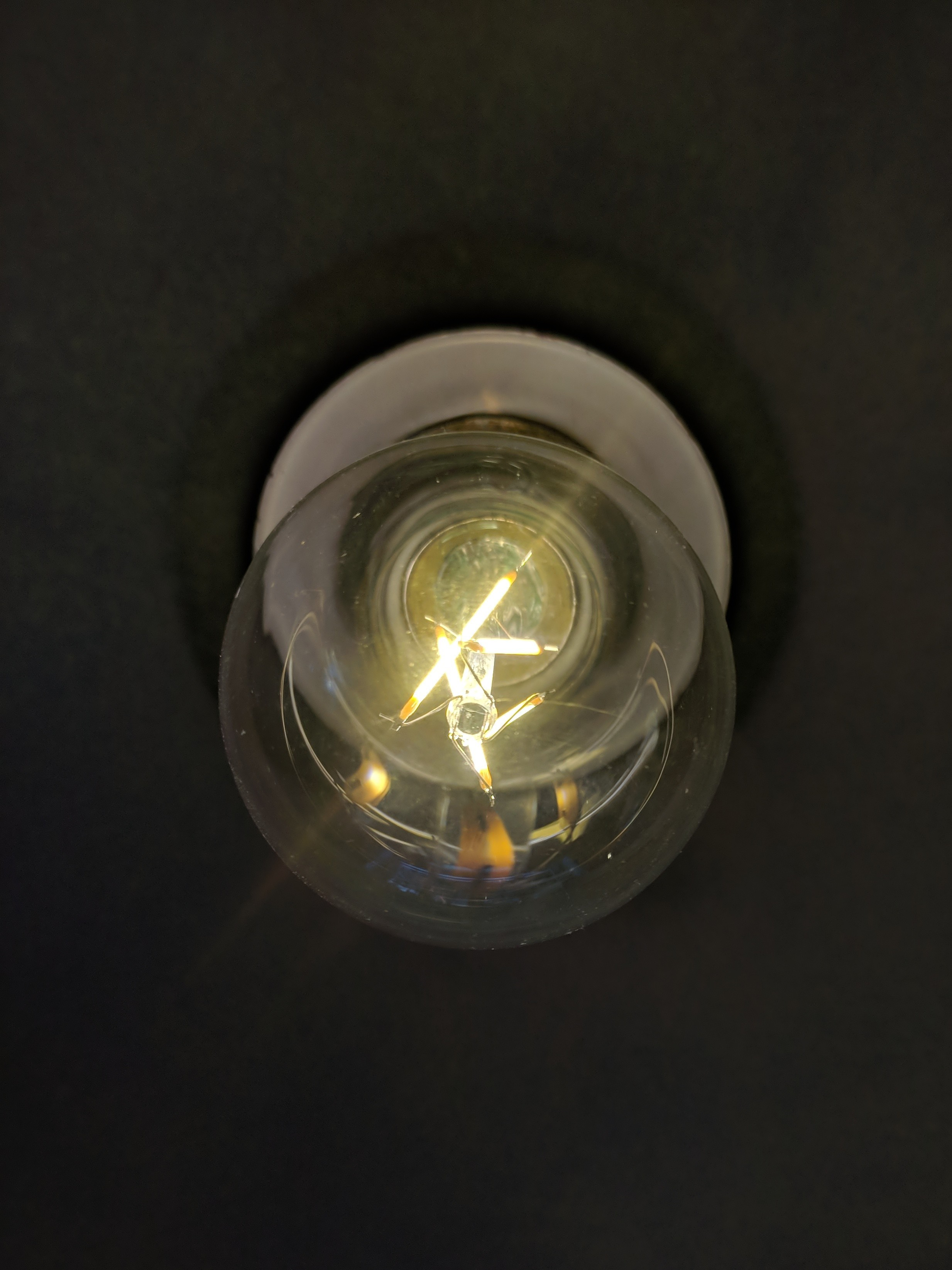
The same 4-filament bulb viewed from the top
