= Synthetic jet =

Type of jet flow on fluid dynamics

In fluid dynamics, a synthetic jet flow—is a type of jet flow, which is made up of the surrounding fluid. Synthetic jets are produced by periodic ejection and suction of fluid from an opening. This oscillatory motion may be driven by a piston or diaphragm inside a cavity among other ways.

A synthetic jet flow was so named by Ari Glezer since the flow is "synthesized" from the surrounding or ambient fluid. Producing a convectional jet requires an external source of fluid, such as piped-in compressed air or plumbing for water.

== Synjet devices ==
Synthetic jet flow can be developed in a number of ways, such as with an electromagnetic driver, a piezoelectric driver, or even a mechanical driver such as a piston. Each moves a membrane or diaphragm up and down hundreds of times per second, sucking the surrounding fluid into a chamber and then expelling it. Although the mechanism is fairly simple, extremely fast cycling requires high-level engineering to produce a device that will last in industrial applications.

For hot spot thermal management, the Synjet, commercially offered by Austin, Texas–based company Nuventix, was patented in 2000 by engineers at Georgia Tech. The tiny synjet module creates jets that can be directed to precise locations for industrial spot cooling. Traditionally, metallic heat sinks conduct heat away from electronic components and into the air, and then a small fan blows the hot air out. Synjet modules replace or augment cooling fans for such devices as microprocessors, memory chips, graphics chips, batteries, and radio frequency components. Additionally, SynJet technology has been used for the thermal management of high power LEDs

Synthetic jet modules have also been widely researched for controlling airflow in aircraft to enhance lift, increase maneuverability, control stalls, and reduce noise. Problems in applying the technology include weight, size, response time, force, and complexity of controlling the flows.

A Caltech researcher has even tested synthetic jet modules to provide thrust for small underwater vehicles, modeled on the natural jets that squid and jellyfish produce. Recently, research team at the School of Engineering, Taylor's University (Malaysia), successfully used synthetic jets as mixing devices. Synthetic jets prove to be effective mixing devices especially for shear sensitive materials.
