= Thermal management (electronics) =

Regulation of the temperature of electronic circuitry to prevent inefficiency or failure

60×60×10 mm straight-finned heat sink with a thermal profile and swirling animated forced convection flow trajectories from a tubeaxial fan, predicted using a CFD analysis package

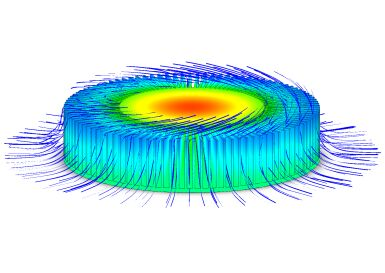
Radial Heat Sink with Thermal Profile and Swirling Forced Convection Flow Trajectories (using CFD analysis)

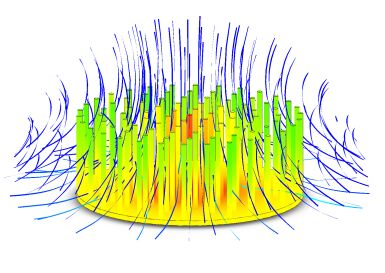
Pin Fin Heat Sink with Thermal Profile and Dione Convection Flow Trajectories (using CFD analysis)

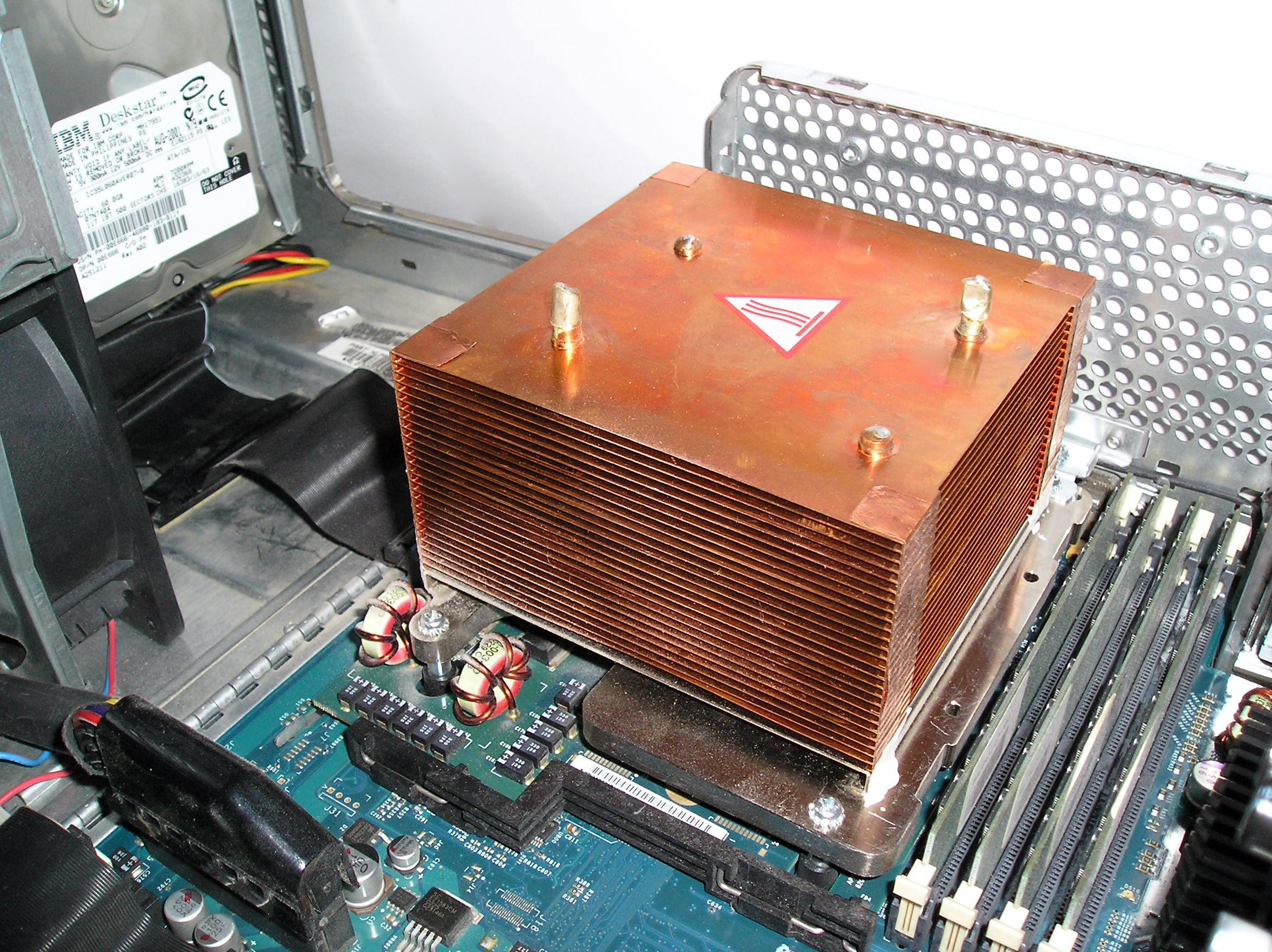
Heat sink in a workstation computer

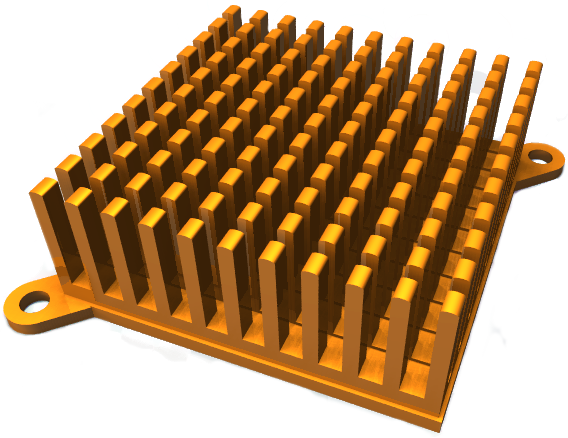
An artist's impression of a motherboard heat sink, rendered using POV-Ray

Free convection thermoelectric cooler (Peltier cooler) with heat sink surface temperature contours, and rising warmer air and falling cooler air flow trajectories, predicted using a CFD analysis package

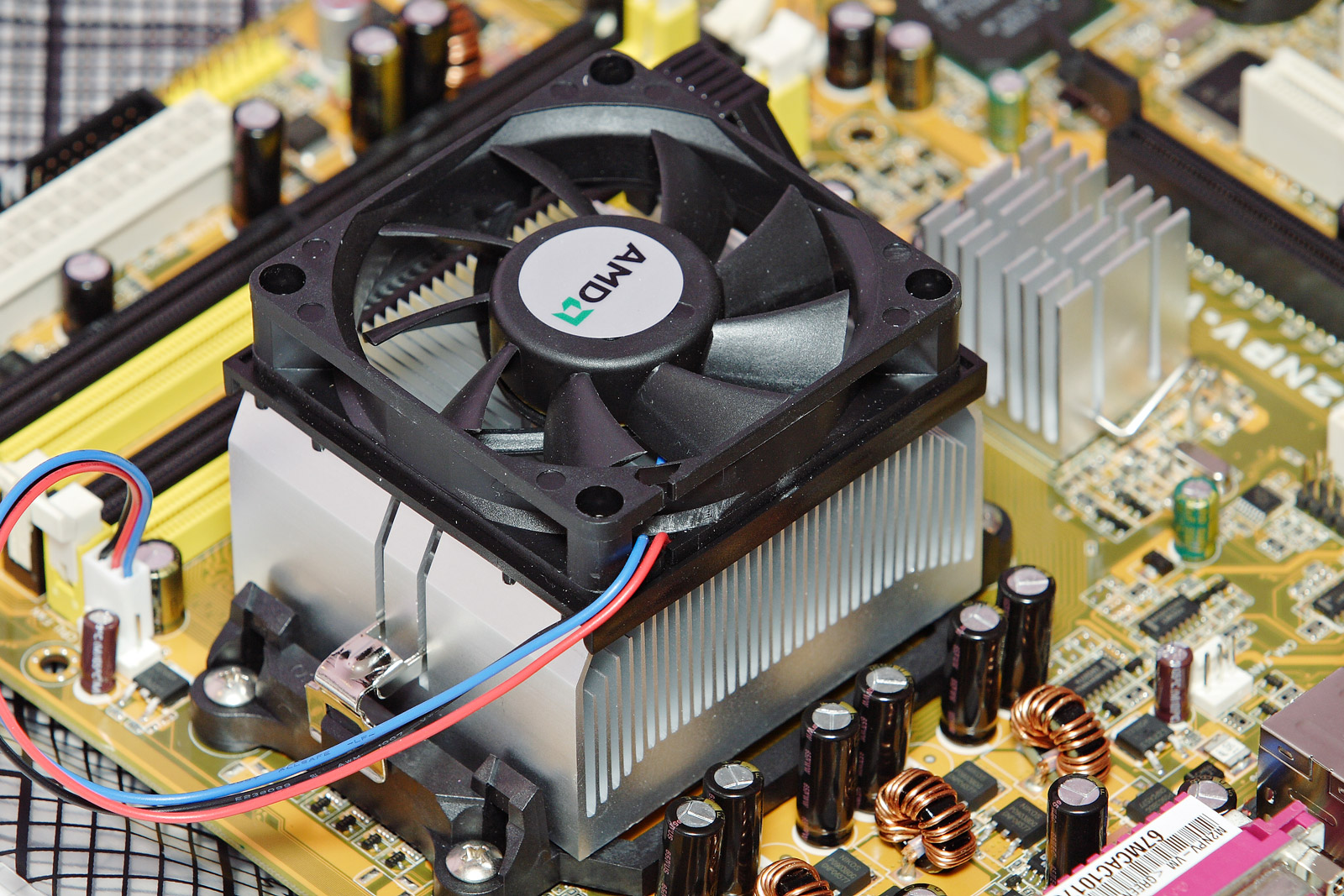
CPU heat sink with fan attached

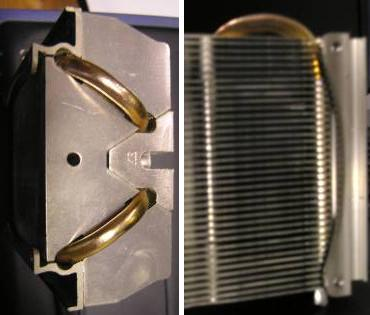
A heat sink (aluminium) incorporating a heat pipe (copper)

All electronic devices and circuitry generate excess heat and thus require thermal management to improve reliability and prevent premature failure. The amount of heat output is equal to the power input, if there are no other energy interactions. There are several techniques for cooling including various styles of heat sinks, thermoelectric coolers, forced air systems and fans, heat pipes, and others. In cases of extreme low environmental temperatures, it may actually be necessary to heat the electronic components to achieve satisfactory operation.

== Overview ==
=== Thermal resistance of devices ===
This is usually quoted as the thermal resistance from junction to case of the semiconductor device. The units are °C/W. For example, a heatsink rated at 10 °C/W will get 10 °C hotter than the surrounding air when it dissipates 1 Watt of heat. Thus, a heatsink with a low °C/W value is more efficient than a heatsink with a high °C/W value. Given two semiconductor devices in the same package, a lower junction to ambient resistance (R_{θJ-C}) indicates a more efficient device. However, when comparing two devices with different die-free package thermal resistances (Ex. DirectFET MT vs wirebond 5x6mm PQFN), their junction to ambient or junction to case resistance values may not correlate directly to their comparative efficiencies. Different semiconductor packages may have different die orientations, different copper(or other metal) mass surrounding the die, different die attach mechanics, and different molding thickness, all of which could yield significantly different junction to case or junction to ambient resistance values, and could thus obscure overall efficiency numbers.

=== Thermal time constants ===
A heatsink's thermal mass can be considered as a capacitor (storing heat instead of charge) and the thermal resistance as an electrical resistance (giving a measure of how fast stored heat can be dissipated). Together, these two components form a thermal RC circuit with an associated time constant given by the product of R and C. This quantity can be used to calculate the dynamic heat dissipation capability of a device, in an analogous way to the electrical case.

=== Thermal interface material ===
A thermal interface material or mastic (a.k.a. TIM) is used to fill the gaps between thermal transfer surfaces, such as between microprocessors and heatsinks, in order to increase thermal transfer efficiency. It has a higher thermal conductivity value in Z-direction than xy-direction.

== Applications ==
=== Personal computers ===
Due to technological developments and public interest, the retail heat sink market rose high. In the early 2000s, CPUs were produced that emitted more and more heat than earlier, escalating requirements for quality cooling systems.

Overclocking has always meant greater cooling needs, and the inherently hotter chips meant more concerns for the enthusiast. Efficient heat sinks are vital to overclocked computer systems because the higher a microprocessor's cooling rate, the faster the computer can operate without instability; generally, faster operation leads to higher performance. Many companies now compete to offer the best heat sink for PC overclocking enthusiasts.

=== Soldering ===
Temporary heat sinks were sometimes used while soldering circuit boards, preventing excessive heat from damaging sensitive nearby electronics. In the simplest case, this means partially gripping a component using a heavy metal crocodile clip or similar clamp. Modern semiconductor devices, which are designed to be assembled by reflow soldering, can usually tolerate soldering temperatures without damage. On the other hand, electrical components such as magnetic reed switches can malfunction if exposed to higher powered soldering irons, so this practice is still very much in use.

=== Batteries ===
In the battery used for electric vehicles, Nominal battery performance is usually specified for working temperatures somewhere in the +20 °C to +30 °C range; however, the actual performance can deviate substantially from this if the battery is operated at higher or, in particular, lower temperatures, so some electric cars have heating and cooling for their batteries.

== Methodologies ==
=== Heat sinks ===
Heat sinks are widely used in electronics and have become essential to modern microelectronics. In common use, it is a metal object brought into contact with an electronic component's hot surface—though in most cases, a thin thermal interface material mediates between the two surfaces. Microprocessors and power handling semiconductors are examples of electronics that need a heat sink to reduce their temperature through increased thermal mass and heat dissipation (primarily by conduction and convection and to a lesser extent by radiation). Heat sinks have become almost essential to modern integrated circuits like microprocessors, DSPs, GPUs, and more.

A heat sink usually consists of a metal structure with one or more flat surfaces to ensure good thermal contact with the components to be cooled, and an array of comb or fin like protrusions to increase the surface contact with the air, and thus the rate of heat dissipation.

A heat sink is sometimes used in conjunction with a fan to increase the rate of airflow over the heat sink. This maintains a larger temperature gradient by replacing warmed air faster than convection would. This is known as a forced air system.

=== Cold plate ===
Placing a conductive thick metal plate, referred to as a cold plate, as a heat transfer interface between a heat source and a cold flowing fluid (or any other heat sink) may improve the cooling performance. In such arrangement, the heat source is cooled under the thick plate instead of being cooled in direct contact with the cooling fluid. It is shown that the thick plate can significantly improve the heat transfer between the heat source and the cooling fluid by way of conducting the heat current in an optimal manner. The two most attractive advantages of this method are that no additional pumping power and no extra heat transfer surface area, that is quite different from fins (extended surfaces).

==== Principle ====
Heat sinks function by efficiently transferring thermal energy ("heat") from an object at high temperature to a second object at a lower temperature with a much greater heat capacity. This rapid transfer of thermal energy quickly brings the first object into thermal equilibrium with the second, lowering the temperature of the first object, fulfilling the heat sink's role as a cooling device. Efficient function of a heat sink relies on rapid transfer of thermal energy from the first object to the heat sink, and the heat sink to the second object.

The most common design of a heat sink is a metal device with many fins. The high thermal conductivity of the metal combined with its large surface area result in the rapid transfer of thermal energy to the surrounding, cooler, air. This cools the heat sink and whatever it is in direct thermal contact with. Use of fluids (for example coolants in refrigeration) and thermal interface material (in cooling electronic devices) ensures good transfer of thermal energy to the heat sink. Similarly, a fan may improve the transfer of thermal energy from the heat sink to the air.

==== Construction and materials ====
A heat sink usually consists of a base with one or more flat surfaces and an array of comb or fin-like protrusions to increase the heat sink's surface area contacting the air, and thus increasing the heat dissipation rate. While a heat sink is a static object, a fan often aids a heat sink by providing increased airflow over the heat sink—thus maintaining a larger temperature gradient by replacing the warmed air more quickly than passive convection achieves alone—this is known as a forced-air system.

Ideally, heat sinks are made from a good thermal conductor such as silver, gold, copper, or aluminum alloy. Copper and aluminum are among the most-frequently used materials for this purpose within electronic devices. Copper (401 W/(m·K) at 300 K) is significantly more expensive than aluminum (237 W/(m·K) at 300 K) but is also roughly twice as efficient as a thermal conductor. Aluminum has the significant advantage that it can be easily formed by extrusion, thus making complex cross-sections possible. Aluminum is also much lighter than copper, offering less mechanical stress on delicate electronic components. Some heat sinks made from aluminum have a copper core as a trade off. The heat sink's contact surface (the base) must be flat and smooth to ensure the best thermal contact with the object needing cooling. Frequently a thermally conductive grease is used to ensure optimal thermal contact; such compounds often contain colloidal silver. Further, a clamping mechanism, screws, or thermal adhesive hold the heat sink tightly onto the component, but specifically without pressure that would crush the component.

==== Performance ====
Heat sink performance (including free convection, forced convection, liquid cooled, and any combination thereof) is a function of material, geometry, and overall surface heat transfer coefficient. Generally, forced convection heat sink thermal performance is improved by increasing the thermal conductivity of the heat sink materials, increasing the surface area (usually by adding extended surfaces, such as fins or foam metal) and by increasing the overall area heat transfer coefficient (usually by increase fluid velocity, such as adding fans, pumps, etc.).

Online heat sink calculators from companies such as Novel Concepts, Inc. and at www.heatsinkcalculator.com can accurately estimate forced and natural convection heat sink performance. For more complex heat sink geometries, or heat sinks with multiple materials or multiple fluids, computation fluid dynamics (CFD) analysis is recommended (see graphics on this page).

=== Convective air cooling ===
This term describes device cooling by the convection currents of the warm air being allowed to escape the confines of the component to be replaced by cooler air. Since warm air normally rises, this method usually requires venting at the top or sides of the casing to be effective.

=== Forced air cooling ===
If there is more air being forced into a system than being pumped out (due to an imbalance in the number of fans), this is referred to as a 'positive' airflow, as the pressure inside the unit is higher than outside.

A balanced or neutral airflow is the most efficient, although a slightly positive airflow can result in less dust build up if filtered properly.

=== Heat pipes ===
A heat pipe is a heat transfer device that uses evaporation and condensation of a two-phase "working fluid" or coolant to transport large quantities of heat with a very small difference in temperature between the hot and cold interfaces. A typical heat pipe consists of sealed hollow tube made of a thermoconductive metal such as copper or aluminium, and a wick to return the working fluid from the evaporator to the condenser. The pipe contains both saturated liquid and vapor of a working fluid (such as water, methanol or ammonia), all other gases being excluded. The most common heat pipe for electronics thermal management has a copper envelope and wick, with water as the working fluid. Copper/methanol is used if the heat pipe needs to operate below the freezing point of water, and aluminum/ammonia heat pipes are used for electronics cooling in space.

The advantage of heat pipes is their great efficiency in transferring heat. The thermal conductivity of heat pipes can be as high as 100,000 W/m K, in contrast to copper, which has a thermal conductivity of around 400 W/m K.

=== Peltier cooling plates ===
Peltier cooling plates /ˈpɛlti.eɪ/ take advantage of the Peltier effect to create a heat flux between the junction of two different conductors of electricity by applying an electric current. This effect is commonly used for cooling electronic components and small instruments. In practice, many such junctions may be arranged in series to increase the effect to the amount of heating or cooling required.

There are no moving parts, so a Peltier plate is maintenance free. It has a relatively low efficiency, so thermoelectric cooling is generally used for electronic devices, such as infra-red sensors, that need to operate at temperatures below ambient. For cooling these devices, the solid state nature of the Peltier plates outweighs their poor efficiency. Thermoelectric junctions are typically around 10% as efficient as the ideal Carnot cycle refrigerator, compared with 40% achieved by conventional compression cycle systems.

=== Synthetic jet air cooling ===
A synthetic jet is produced by a continual flow of vortices that are formed by alternating brief ejection and suction of air across an opening such that the net mass flux is zero. A unique feature of these jets is that they are formed entirely from the working fluid of the flow system in which they are deployed can produce a net momentum to the flow of a system without net mass injection to the system.

Synthetic jet air movers have no moving parts and are thus maintenance free. Due to the high heat transfer coefficients, high reliability but lower overall flow rates, Synthetic jet air movers are usually used at the chip level and not at the system level for cooling. However depending on the size and complexity of the systems they can be used for both at times.

=== Electrostatic fluid acceleration ===
An electrostatic fluid accelerator (EFA) is a device which pumps a fluid such as air without any moving parts. Instead of using rotating blades, as in a conventional fan, an EFA uses an electric field to propel electrically charged air molecules. Because air molecules are normally neutrally charged, the EFA has to create some charged molecules, or ions, first. Thus there are three basic steps in the fluid acceleration process: ionize air molecules, use those ions to push many more neutral molecules in a desired direction, and then recapture and neutralize the ions to eliminate any net charge.

The basic principle has been understood for some time but only in recent years have seen developments in the design and manufacture of EFA devices that may allow them to find practical and economical applications, such as in micro-cooling of electronics components.

=== Recent developments ===
More recently, high thermal conductivity materials such as synthetic diamond and boron arsenide cooling sinks are being researched to provide better cooling. Boron arsenide has been reported with high thermal conductivity and high thermal boundary conductance with gallium nitride transistors and thus better performance than diamond and silicon carbide cooling technologies. For example, funded by the U.S. Department of Defense, research has been underway using high-power density gallium nitride transistors with synthetic diamonds as thermal conductors. Also, some heat sinks are constructed of multiple materials with desirable characteristics, such as phase change materials, which can store a great deal of energy due to their heat of fusion.

== Thermal simulation of electronics ==
Thermal simulations give engineers a visual representation of the temperature and airflow inside the equipment. Thermal simulations enable engineers to design the cooling system; to optimise a design to reduce power consumption, weight and cost; and to verify the thermal design to ensure there are no issues when the equipment is built. Most thermal simulation software uses Computational fluid dynamics techniques to predict temperature and airflow of an electronics system.

=== Design ===
Thermal simulation is often required to determine how to effectively cool components within design constraints. Simulation enables the design and verification of the thermal design of the equipment at a very early stage and throughout the design of the electronic and mechanical parts. Designing with thermal properties in mind from the start reduces the risk of last minute design changes to fix thermal issues.

Using thermal simulation as part of the design process enables the creation of an optimal and innovative product design that performs to specification and meets customers' reliability requirements.

=== Optimise ===
It is easy to design a cooling system for almost any equipment if there is unlimited space, power and budget. However, the majority of equipment will have a rigid specification that leaves a limited margin for error. There is a constant pressure to reduce power requirements, system weight and cost parts, without compromising performance or reliability. Thermal simulation allows experimentation with optimisation, such as modifying heatsink geometry or reducing fan speeds in a virtual environment, which is faster, cheaper and safer than physical experiment and measurement.

=== Verify ===
Traditionally, the first time the thermal design of the equipment is verified is after a prototype has been built. The device is powered up, perhaps inside an environmental chamber, and temperatures of the critical parts of the system are measured using sensors such as thermocouples. If any problems are discovered, the project is delayed while a solution is sought. A change to the design of a PCB or enclosure part may be required to fix the issue, which will take time and cost a significant amount of money. If thermal simulation is used as part of the design process of the equipment, thermal design issue will be identified before a prototype is built. Fixing an issue at the design stage is both quicker and cheaper than modifying the design after a prototype is created.

=== Software ===
There are a wide range of software tools that are designed for thermal simulation of electronics include 6SigmaET, Ansys' IcePak and Mentor Graphics' FloTHERM.

== Telecommunications environments ==
Thermal management measures must be taken to accommodate high heat release equipment in telecommunications rooms. Generic supplemental/spot cooling techniques, as well as turnkey cooling solutions developed by equipment manufacturers are viable solutions. Such solutions could allow very high heat release equipment to be housed in a central office that has a heat density at or near the cooling capacity available from the central air handler.

According to Telcordia GR-3028, Thermal Management in Telecommunications Central Offices, the most common way of cooling modern telecommunications equipment internally is by utilizing multiple high-speed fans to create forced convection cooling. Although direct and indirect liquid cooling may be introduced in the future, the current design of new electronic equipment is geared towards maintaining air as the cooling medium.

A well-developed "holistic" approach is required to understand current and future thermal management problems. Space cooling on one hand, and equipment cooling on the other, cannot be viewed as two isolated parts of the overall thermal challenge. The main purpose of an equipment facility's air-distribution system is to distribute conditioned air in such a way that the electronic equipment is cooled effectively. The overall cooling efficiency depends on how the air distribution system moves air through the equipment room, how the equipment moves air through the equipment frames, and how these airflows interact with one another. High heat-dissipation levels rely heavily on a seamless integration of equipment-cooling and room-cooling designs.

The existing environmental solutions in telecommunications facilities have inherent limitations. For example, most mature central offices have limited space available for large air duct installations that are required for cooling high heat density equipment rooms. Furthermore, steep temperature gradients develop quickly should a cooling outage occur; this has been well documented through computer modeling and direct measurements and observations. Although environmental backup systems may be in place, there are situations when they will not help. In a recent case, telecommunications equipment in a major central office was overheated, and critical services were interrupted by a complete cooling shut down initiated by a false smoke alarm.

A major obstacle for effective thermal management is the way heat-release data is currently reported. Suppliers generally specify the maximum (nameplate) heat release from the equipment. In reality, equipment configuration and traffic diversity will result in significantly lower heat release numbers.

=== Equipment cooling classes ===
As stated in GR-3028, most equipment environments maintain cool front (maintenance) aisles and hot rear (wiring) aisles, where cool supply air is delivered to the front aisles and hot air is removed from the rear aisles. This scheme provides multiple benefits, including effective equipment cooling and high thermal efficiency.

In the traditional room cooling class utilized by the majority of service providers, equipment cooling would benefit from air intake and exhaust locations that help move air from the front aisle to the rear aisle. The traditional front-bottom to top-rear pattern, however, has been replaced in some equipment with other airflow patterns that may not ensure adequate equipment cooling in high heat density areas.

A classification of equipment (shelves and cabinets) into Equipment-Cooling (EC) classes serves the purpose of classifying the equipment with regard to the cooling air intake and hot air exhaust locations, i.e., the equipment airflow schemes or protocols.

The EC-Class syntax provides a flexible and important “common language.” It is used for developing Heat-Release Targets (HRTs), which are important for network reliability, equipment and space planning, and infrastructure capacity planning. HRTs take into account physical limitations of the environment and environmental baseline criteria, including the supply airflow capacity, air diffusion into the equipment space, and air-distribution/equipment interactions. In addition to being used for developing the HRTs, the EC Classification can be used to show compliance on product sheets, provide internal design specifications, or specify requirements in purchase orders.

The Room-Cooling classification (RC-Class) refers to the way the overall equipment space is air-conditioned (cooled). The main purpose of RC-Classes is to provide a logical classification and description of legacy and non-legacy room-cooling schemes or protocols in the central office environment. In addition to being used for developing HRTs, the RC-classification can be used in internal central office design specifications or in purchase orders.

Supplemental-Cooling classes (SC-Class) provide a classification of supplemental cooling techniques. Service providers use supplemental/spot-cooling solutions to supplement the cooling capacity (e.g., to treat occurrences of “hot spots”) provided by the general room-cooling protocol as expressed by the RC-Class.

=== Economic impact ===
Energy consumption by telecommunications equipment currently accounts for a high percentage of the total energy consumed in central offices. Most of this energy is subsequently released as heat to the surrounding equipment space. Since most of the remaining central office energy use goes to cool the equipment room, the economic impact of making the electronic equipment energy-efficient would be considerable for companies that use and operate telecommunications equipment. It would reduce capital costs for support systems, and improve thermal conditions in the equipment room.

== See also ==
- Heat generation in integrated circuits
- Thermal resistance in electronics
- Thermal management of high-power LEDs
- Thermal design power
- Heat pipe
- Computer cooling
- Radiator
- Active cooling
