= Active cooling =

Cooling methods that expend energy to cool a system or component

Active cooling refers to cooling methods that use an external energy input to increase heat removal from a system or component. In buildings and electronic equipment, active cooling commonly uses electrically or thermally driven equipment such as fans, pumps, heat pumps, air-conditioning systems and other forced-convection cooling devices.

Unlike passive cooling, which relies primarily on natural heat-transfer processes and building or component design, active cooling introduces mechanical or electrical input to increase cooling capacity. The additional cooling can provide greater temperature control, but it also introduces energy use, equipment cost and maintenance requirements.

== Building usage ==
Active cooling is widely used to maintain indoor thermal conditions when passive measures alone cannot meet the required cooling load. A building energy balance can be represented as:

$\rho \cdot c_p \cdot V \cdot dT/dt = E_{int} + E_{Conv} + E_{Vent} + E_{AC}$

where $\rho$ is air density, $c_p$ is the specific heat capacity of air at constant pressure, $V$ is the volume of the thermal zone, $E_{int}$ represents internal heat gains, $E_{Conv}$ represents heat transfer through the building envelope, $E_{Vent}$ represents heat exchange associated with ventilation, and $E_{AC}$ represents mechanical heating or cooling.

A review of residential cooling technologies identified fans, evaporative coolers and heat pumps as common active cooling methods used in dwellings.

=== Fans ===
Fans use mechanical power to move air and increase convective heat transfer. In buildings, increased air movement can improve occupant thermal comfort even when the fan does not directly lower the bulk air temperature.

=== Heat pumps ===
A heat pump transfers heat from one location to another. During cooling operation, a heat pump removes heat from the indoor space and transfers it outdoors. Most residential heat pumps use electricity to operate the compressor and associated equipment.

==== Vapor-compression heat pumps ====
In a vapor-compression system, a refrigerant circulates through a compressor, condenser, expansion device and evaporator. The compressor raises the refrigerant pressure and temperature; heat is then rejected at the condenser. After expansion to a lower pressure, the refrigerant absorbs heat in the evaporator before returning to the compressor.

==== Absorption heat pumps ====
Absorption heat pumps use thermal energy as their principal driving energy rather than relying primarily on a mechanically driven compressor. Heat sources can include natural gas, steam, solar-heated water or geothermal-heated water. Electrical power may still be required for pumps and controls.

=== Evaporative coolers ===
Evaporative cooling lowers air temperature through the evaporation of water. It is most effective in relatively dry climates, where the air can absorb additional moisture.

==== Direct ====
In direct evaporative cooling, outside air passes through or across wetted material. Water evaporates into the supply air, reducing its dry-bulb temperature while increasing its humidity.

==== Indirect ====
Indirect evaporative cooling uses a separate evaporatively cooled air stream and a heat exchanger. The supply air is cooled without being brought into direct contact with the evaporating water, so its moisture content does not increase significantly.

== Electronic device cooling ==
Electronic devices require thermal management to maintain component temperatures within acceptable operating limits. Active electronic cooling includes forced-air cooling using fans, pumped liquid cooling and other systems in which external energy is used to enhance heat transfer.

Forced-air heat sinks remain a common active cooling method for electronic equipment. A fan increases airflow across the heat-transfer surface, enhancing forced convection compared with natural-convection cooling.

== Other applications ==
=== Thermoelectric-generator-powered cooling ===
A thermoelectric generator (TEG) converts a temperature difference into electrical power through the Seebeck effect. Researchers have investigated whether waste heat from an electronic processor can provide enough thermoelectric power to assist its own active cooling.

In the reported experiment, a thermoelectric generator powered a fan used to cool a Raspberry Pi 3. The active system reduced the processor temperature by several degrees Celsius compared with the passive reference cooler while using energy harvested from heat dissipated by the processor. The researchers noted that additional energy storage was required to overcome the fan's startup-power requirement.

=== Near-immersion active cooling ===
Near-immersion active cooling (NIAC) is a thermal-management technique developed for wire arc additive manufacturing (WAAM). In the technique, the deposited component is produced inside a tank while the level of cooling water rises as successive metal layers are added, keeping the cooling liquid close to the deposition region.

Experiments on aluminium WAAM components found that NIAC reduced heat accumulation while maintaining relatively stable wall geometry. The study did not find a measurable increase in porosity caused by the water cooling and reported reduced anisotropy in mechanical properties compared with the other thermal-management conditions examined.

Subsequent research has examined NIAC with other alloys and manufacturing conditions. A 2025 study of IN718 wire-arc additive manufacturing found that near-immersion cooling increased cooling rates, reduced thermal accumulation and influenced the resulting solidification microstructure.

== Comparison with passive cooling ==
Active and passive cooling differ primarily in the way heat removal is achieved. Passive methods rely on mechanisms such as natural ventilation, shading, radiation and natural convection, while active methods use externally powered equipment to increase or control heat transfer.

Active systems can provide greater and more controllable cooling capacity when environmental conditions or heat loads exceed what passive methods can manage. Their disadvantages include energy consumption, operating costs, maintenance requirements and additional mechanical equipment.

Passive cooling generally has lower operating energy requirements but its effectiveness depends strongly on climate, building design or component configuration. Selection between active, passive and hybrid cooling therefore depends on the required temperature reduction, local conditions, energy use, initial cost and operational requirements.

== See also ==
- Cooling
- Computer cooling
- Electronics cooling
- Passive cooling
- Passive daytime radiative cooling
- Thermal management (electronics)

=== Near-immersion active cooling (NIAC) ===
Near-immersion active cooling (NIAC) is a thermal-management technique developed to reduce heat accumulation during wire arc additive manufacturing (WAAM). Heat accumulation during repeated layer deposition can alter bead geometry, cooling rates, microstructure and mechanical properties, and active cooling is one of several methods investigated for controlling the thermal history of WAAM components.

The NIAC concept was introduced and experimentally evaluated by da Silva and colleagues in 2020. In their arrangement, the workpiece is deposited inside a tank containing water, and the water level is raised as the height of the deposited component increases so that the previously deposited material remains close to immersion while the deposition zone remains above the liquid.

In experiments using Al-5Mg walls, the researchers compared NIAC with natural cooling and a fixed-level water-cooling arrangement. NIAC kept the temperature of the deposited material lower as the wall height increased and produced a more consistent wall width. The study did not find a measurable increase in porosity caused by water cooling and reported reduced anisotropy in the measured mechanical properties.

Subsequent research has investigated NIAC with other materials and cooling media. A 2025 study of AA5356 aluminium compared water, solid carbon dioxide and liquid nitrogen as cooling media. Water and solid carbon dioxide provided effective cooling and refined the microstructure, while rapid vaporisation limited the effectiveness of liquid nitrogen under the tested conditions. The water-cooled specimens had the highest tensile strength among the NIAC conditions evaluated and relatively low porosity.

Another 2025 study applied NIAC to WAAM of the nickel-based superalloy IN718. The experiments found that NIAC increased the cooling rate by approximately 3.5 times under the tested conditions, reduced heat accumulation and refined the solidification microstructure, including reductions in primary dendrite-arm spacing and the volume fraction of the Laves phase.

Reviews of WAAM research describe active and interpass cooling as part of a broader group of thermal-management techniques used to control heat accumulation, dimensional accuracy, residual stress and material properties during deposition.

== Comparison with passive cooling ==
Passive cooling removes or redistributes heat without requiring dedicated external power to drive the cooling process, relying instead on mechanisms such as natural convection, conduction, radiation or phase-change materials. Active cooling introduces external energy to increase heat-transfer rates, for example by operating fans, pumps, compressors or thermoelectric devices.

=== Advantages ===
Active cooling can provide greater heat-transfer capacity and more direct control of component or indoor temperatures than purely passive cooling. In electronic systems this can be important when heat flux exceeds the capacity of natural convection or other passive heat-transfer methods. Active approaches used in electronics include forced-air cooling, pumped liquid cooling, jet and spray cooling, immersion cooling and thermoelectric cooling.

In buildings, mechanical cooling systems can provide substantial cooling under conditions where passive approaches alone cannot maintain the required indoor temperature. The relative performance of active and passive methods depends on factors including climate, building design, cooling load and the cooling technology used.

=== Disadvantages ===
Active cooling requires an external energy input and normally involves additional components such as fans, pumps, compressors, valves or control equipment. These components can increase operating energy use, system complexity and maintenance requirements compared with passive cooling.

Passive cooling generally requires less auxiliary energy, but its cooling capacity and effectiveness can depend strongly on environmental conditions and system design. In buildings, the choice between active and passive cooling therefore involves trade-offs among climate, achievable temperature reduction, installation cost, operating energy, maintenance, available space and retrofit requirements.

Neither approach is universally preferable; active and passive techniques may also be combined in hybrid thermal-management systems when the application requires both reduced energy consumption and controlled cooling performance.
