= Junction temperature =

Highest operating temperature of a semiconductor

Junction temperature, short for transistor junction temperature, is the temperature of the actual semiconductor in an electronic device. In operation, it is higher than case temperature and the temperature of the part's exterior. The difference is equal to the amount of heat transferred from the junction to case multiplied by the junction-to-case thermal resistance.

== Microscopic effects ==
Various physical properties of semiconductor materials are temperature dependent. These include the diffusion rate of dopant elements, carrier mobilities and the thermal production of charge carriers. At the low end, sensor diode noise can be reduced by cryogenic cooling. On the high end, the resulting increase in local power dissipation can lead to thermal runaway that may cause transient or permanent device failure.

== Maximum junction temperature calculation ==
Maximum junction temperature (sometimes abbreviated TJMax) is specified in a part's datasheet and is used when calculating the necessary case-to-ambient thermal resistance for a given power dissipation. This in turn is used to select an appropriate heat sink if applicable. Other cooling methods include thermoelectric cooling and coolants.

In modern processors from manufacturers such as Intel, AMD, and Qualcomm, the core temperature is measured by a network of sensors. Every time the temperature sensing network determines that a rise above the specified junction temperature ($T_J$), is imminent, measures such as clock gating, clock stretching, clock speed reduction and others (commonly referred to as thermal throttling) are applied to prevent the temperature to raise further. If the applied mechanisms are not compensating enough for the processor to stay below the junction temperature, the device may shut down to prevent permanent damage.

An estimation of the chip-junction temperature $T_J$ can be obtained from the following equation:

$T_J = T_A + (R_{\theta JA}P_D)$

where: $T_A$= ambient temperature for the package [°C]

$R_{\theta JA}$= junction to ambient thermal resistance [°C / W]

$P_D$= power dissipation in package [W]

== Measuring junction temperature (T_{J}) ==
Many semiconductors and their surrounding optics are small, making it difficult to measure junction temperature with direct methods such as thermocouples and infrared cameras.

Junction temperature may be measured indirectly using the device's inherent voltage/temperature dependency characteristic. Combined with a Joint Electron Device Engineering Council (JEDEC) technique such as JESD 51-1 and JESD 51-51, this method will produce accurate $T_J$ measurements. However, this measurement technique is difficult to implement in multi-LED series circuits due to high common mode voltages and the need for fast, high duty cycle current pulses. This difficulty can be overcome by combining high-speed sampling digital multimeters and fast high-compliance pulsed current sources.

Once junction temperature is known, another important parameter, thermal resistance (Rθ), may be calculated using the following equation:

$R_\theta = \frac{\Delta T}{V_f I_f}$

=== Junction temperature of LEDs and laser diodes ===
An LED or laser diode’s junction temperature (Tj) is a primary determinate for long-term reliability; it also is a key factor for photometry. For example, a typical white LED output declines 20% for a 50 °C rise in junction temperature. Because of this temperature sensitivity, LED measurement standards, like IESNA’s LM-85, require that the junction temperature is determined when making photometric measurements.

Junction heating can be minimized in these devices by using the Continuous Pulse Test Method specified in LM-85. An L-I sweep conducted with an Osram Yellow LED shows that Single Pulse Test Method measurements yield a 25% drop in luminous flux output and DC Test Method measurements yield a 70% drop.

== See also ==
- Safe operating area
- P-N Junction
- Metal Semiconductor Junction
