= L70 =

L70 can refer to:

- LG Optimus L70 a smartphone.
- Bofors 40 mm Automatic Gun L/70, a Swedish anti-aircraft gun.
- Bofors 57 mm L/70 naval artillery gun, a Swedish naval gun.
- Daihatsu Mira#L70/L80 series, a variant of a Japanese car.
- HMS Farndale (L70), a British naval ship.
- A Lumen maintenance notation for time (ex. hours) a light source maintains 70% of its original output, also written L_{70}.
- Valmet L-70 Vinka, a Finnish military aircraft.
