= LED street light =

Type of lighting fixture

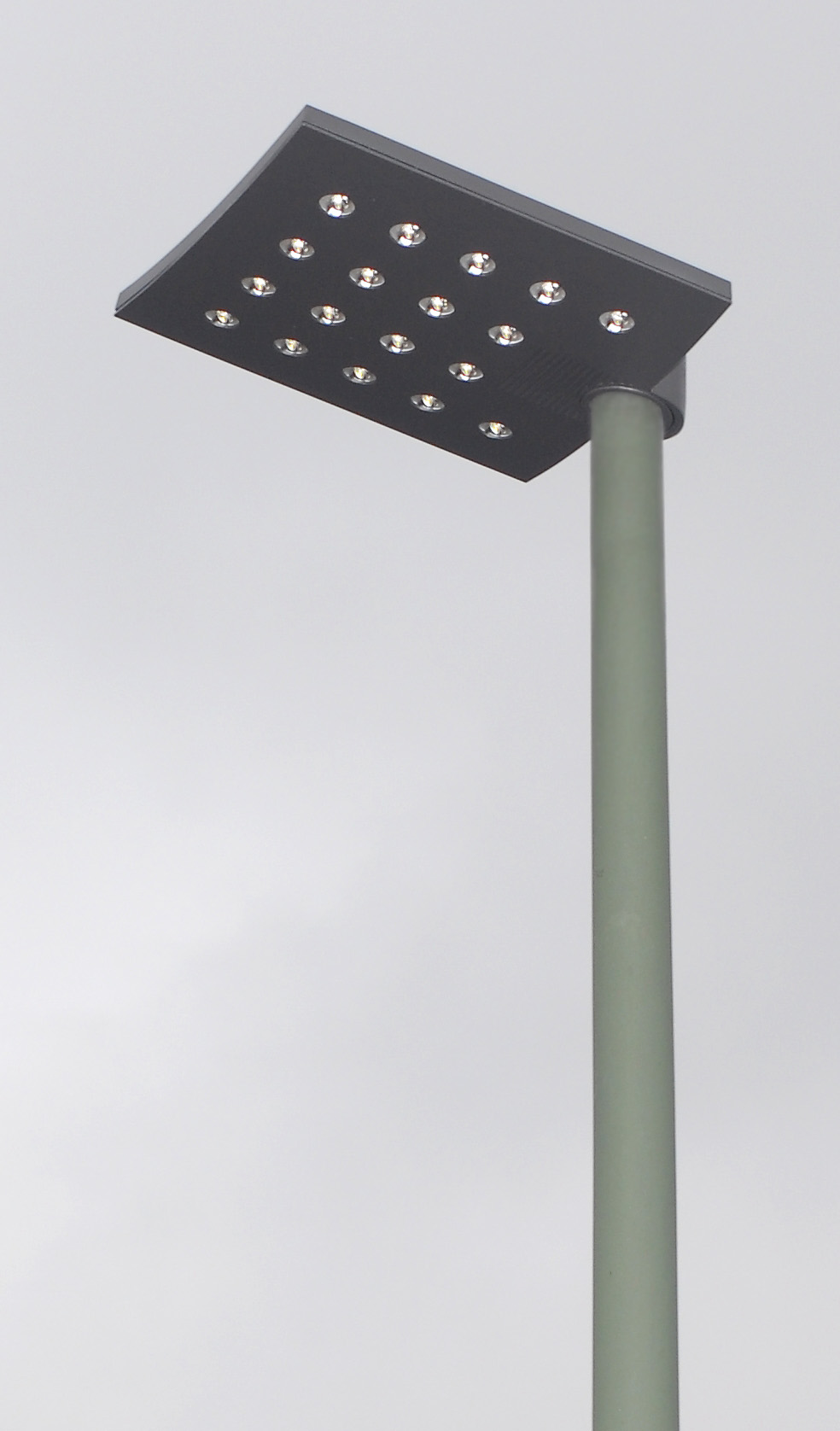
- LED street light in the United Kingdom
- Component type: LED, street light

An LED street light or road light is an integrated light-emitting diode (LED) light fixture that is used for street lighting.

== Design and style ==
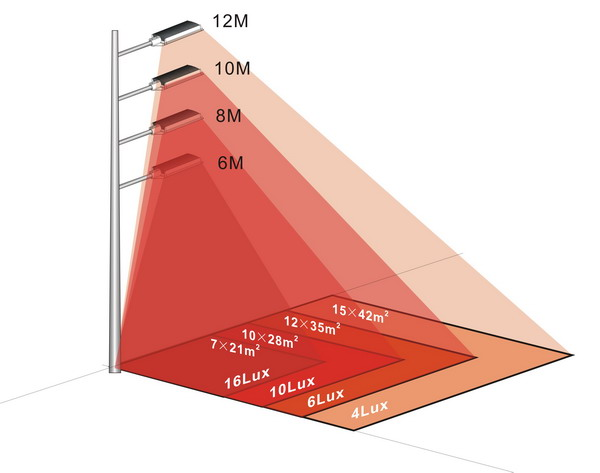
LED street light beam pattern

An LED street light is an integrated light that uses light emitting diodes (LED) as its light source. These are considered integrated lights because, in most cases, the luminaire and the fixture are not separate parts. In manufacturing, the LED light cluster is sealed on a panel and then assembled to the LED panel with a heat sink to become an integrated lighting fixture.

Different designs have been created that incorporate various types of LEDs into a light fixture. Either few high-power LEDs or many low-power LEDs may be used. The shape of the LED street light depends on several factors, including LED configuration, the heat sink used with the LEDs and aesthetic design preference.

Heat sinks for LED street lights are similar in design to heat sinks used to cool other electronics such as computers and smart street light energy saving systems. Heat sinks tend to have as many grooves as possible to facilitate the flow of hot air away from the LEDs. The area of heat exchange directly affects the lifespan of the LED street light.

The lifespan of an LED street light is determined by its light output compared to its original design specification. Once its brightness decreases by 30 percent, white (clear) an LED street light is considered to be at the end of its life.

Most LED street lights have a lens on the LED panel, which is designed to cast its light in a rectangular pattern, an advantage compared to traditional street lights, which typically have a reflector on the back side of a high-pressure sodium lamp. In this case, much of the luminance of the light is lost and produces light pollution in the air and surrounding environment.

A drawback of LED focus panels is that most light is directed to the road, and less light to the footpaths and other areas. This can be addressed by the use of specialized lens design and adjustable mounting spigots.

In performing a LED street lighting project, easy LED luminary models simplify the optimization for high-performance illumination designs. These practical equations may be used to optimize LED street lighting installations in order to minimize light pollution, increase comfort and visibility, and maximize both illumination uniformity and light utilization efficiency.

== Energy efficiency ==
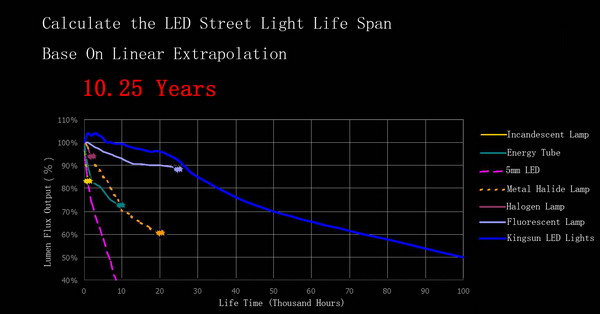
The life span of an LED as compared to other light sources

The primary appeal of LED street lighting is energy efficiency compared to conventional street lighting fixture technologies such as high pressure sodium (HPS) and metal halide (MH). Research continues to improve the efficiency of newer models of LED street lights (modernizing with LED street lights). However, LED street lighting is not as efficient as low-pressure sodium (SOX) street lighting in the United Kingdom.

An LED street light based on a 901-milliwatt output LED can normally produce the same amount of (or higher) luminance as a traditional light, but requires only half of the power consumption. LED lighting does not typically fail, but instead decreases in output until it needs to be replaced. It is estimated that installation of energy efficient street lighting in the 10 largest metropolitan areas in the U.S. could reduce annual carbon dioxide emissions by 1.2 million metric tons, the equivalent of taking 212,000 vehicles off the road, and save at least $90 million annually in electricity costs.

As LED lighting fixtures normally produce less illumination it is important to use a well-distributed illumination pattern in order to produce the same illumination as higher-lumen conventional fixtures. For example, different LEDs in one fixture can target different points on the street.

== Advantages of LED street lights ==
- Low energy consumption: Many LED lighting retrofits have been claimed to dramatically reduce energy use.
- Long and predictable lifetime: The projected lifetime of LED street lights is usually 10 to 15 years, two to four times the life of currently prevalent HPS. (LEDs themselves do not generally fail or "burn out" in a way comparable to other technologies, and barring catastrophic failure of other mechanical or electronic components of the LED fixture, lifetimes are typically set by a decrease in luminous output of 30%. But the functional lifetime of an LED fixture is limited by the weakest link; associated drive electronics are typically projected to last about 50,000 hrs. It is important to understand that no LED streetlighting products have been in service long enough to confirm the projections). If realized in practice, the less frequent need to service or replace LEDs will mean lower maintenance cost.
- More accurate color rendering: The color rendering index is the ability of a light source to correctly reproduce the colors of the objects in comparison to an ideal light source. Improved color rendering makes it easier for drivers to recognize objects.
- Quick turn on and off: Unlike fluorescent and high-intensity discharge (HID) lamps, such as mercury vapor, metal halide, and sodium vapor lamps, which take time to heat up once switched on, LEDs come on with full brightness instantly.
- RoHS compliance: LEDs don't contain mercury or lead, and don't release poisonous gases if damaged.
- Optically efficient lighting equipment: Other types of street lights use a reflector to capture the light emitted upwards from the lamp. Even under the best of conditions, the reflector absorbs some of the light. Also for fluorescent lamps and other lamps with phosphor coated bulbs, the bulb itself absorbs some of the light directed back down by the reflector. The glass cover, called a refractor, helps project the light down on the street in a desired pattern but some light is wasted by being directed up to the sky (light pollution). LED lamp assemblies (panels) can send light in the desired directions without a reflector.
- Higher light output even at low temperatures: While fluorescent lights are comparably energy efficient, on average they tend to have lesser light output at winter temperatures.

== Disadvantages of LED street lights ==
Malfunctioning LED street lights flickering

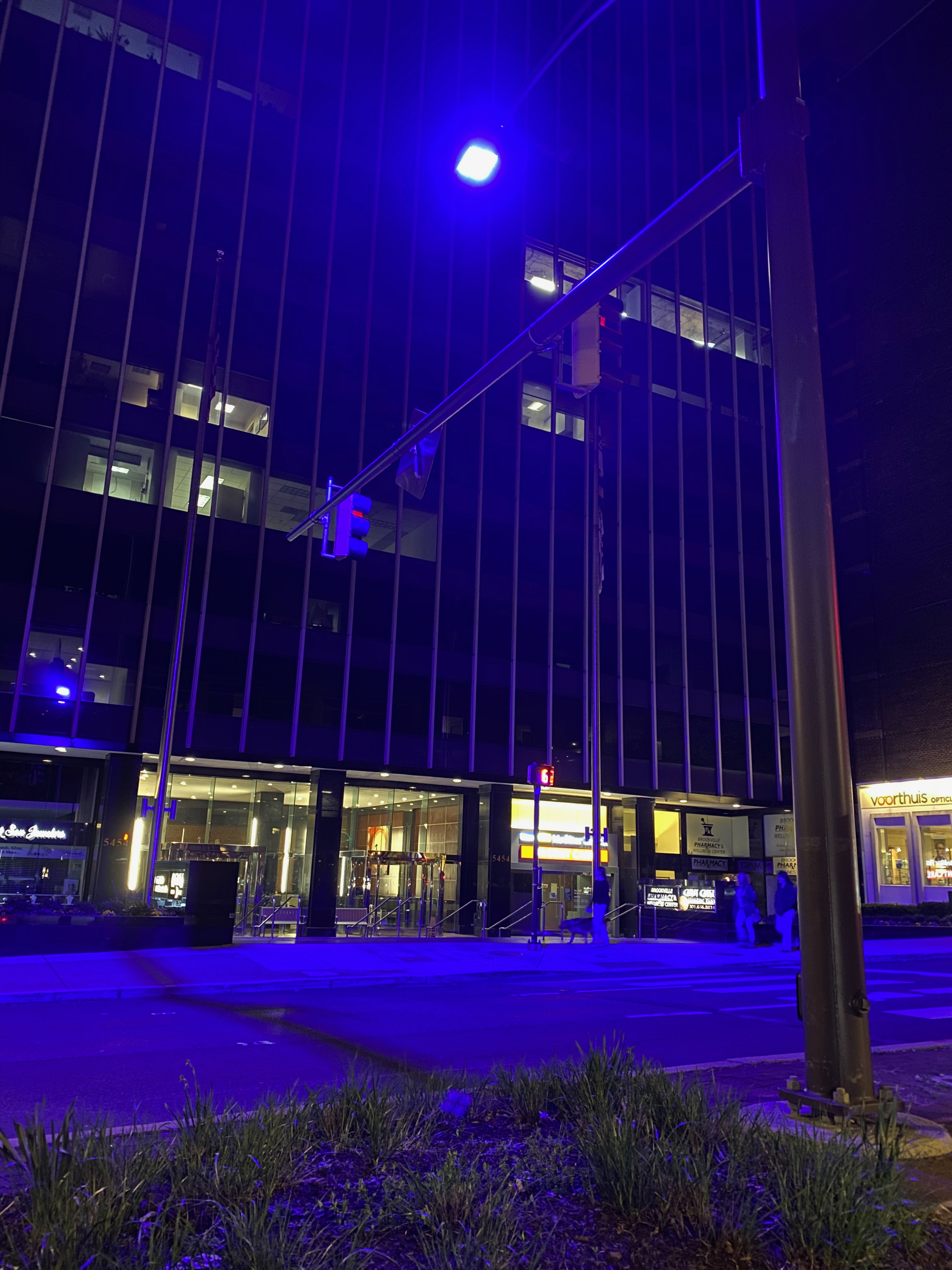
Defective LED street light turned purple

- Many people dislike the ambiance produced by LEDs with color temperatures of 4000K or higher. 2700K and 3000K LEDs are mostly used for indoor lighting.
- The initial cost of LED street lighting is high and as a consequence it takes several years for the savings on energy to pay for that. The high cost derives in part from the material used since LEDs are often made on sapphire or other expensive substrates.
- As a result of the Purkinje effect, the dark-adapted human eye is very sensitive to blue and green light that LED street lights emit in large amounts, as compared to the yellow and orange high-pressure sodium lights that are typically being replaced. This magnifies the effect of light pollution - particularly sky glow.
- The major increase in the blue and green content of artificial sky glow arising from widespread LED lighting is likely to increase impacts on bird migration and other nocturnal animal behaviours.
- Blue-rich light pollution from LED streetlights can disrupt circannual rhythms and cause the complete loss of an organism's seasonal clock. This impacts important behaviors such as feeding, reproduction, thermoregulation and hibernation. In some cases the failure to hibernate or properly thermoregulate due to this loss of seasonal timing can kill the organism.
- There is progressive wear of layers of phosphor in white LEDs. The change in color slowly moves devices from one photobiological risk group to a higher one. Manufacturing problems can lead to defects of LED street lights resulting in delamination of the phosphor coating layer much sooner than the design life of the lights. This causes the white LED lights to turn blue or purple. The issues of large scale defective lights happened in many cities in United States and Canada.
- Malfunctioning LED street lights can cause them to flicker, creating a strobe light effect. Partial power outages can also cause the same effect as the LED street lights can detect residual electrical current. The strobe effect may trigger seizures in some people.
- The blue-rich spectrum of LED streetlights is less effective than the yellow-dominant spectrum of Sodium lighting in producing a targeted luminance level on roadways, as the spectral reflectance of roadway pavement is higher for longer wavelengths of light. Due to this difference in spectral reflectance, much of the light produced by an LED streetlight is absorbed by the pavement rather than reflected.
- LED streetlights produce greater levels of glare than previous sodium light sources. This is largely due to fixtures with smaller source areas resulting in increased luminance levels, a metric of light intensity. The blue-rich spectrum of LED streetlights also leads to increased levels of glare, especially discomfort glare.
- The blue-rich spectrum of LED streetlights leads to greater impacts of Rayleigh Scattering, where short wavelengths of light scatter within small particles more than long wavelengths of light do. This increased light scattering within the atmosphere leads to increased skyglow. During bad weather such as heavy rain, snow or fog, this scattering can create physical walls of light that obstruct vision.
- As the human eye ages the lens of the eye yellows. This changes the spectral transparency of the lens to favor longer wavelengths of light, with significant losses in transparency for shorter wavelengths of light. Due to this spectrum-based loss in transparency the blue-rich spectrum of LED streetlights becomes less visible as an individual ages. For example in the eye of someone aged 50, the light transmission of a 4000K LED is 11% lower than that of a 2700K LED, relative to someone aged 25.

=== Health concerns ===
- Exposure to the light of white LED bulbs suppresses melatonin by up to five times more than exposure to the light of pressure sodium bulbs. The fact that white light, emitting at wavelengths of 400-500 nanometers suppresses the production of melatonin produced by the pineal gland is known. The effect is disruption of a human being's biological clock resulting in poor sleeping and rest periods.
- Research at the University of Madrid Complutense University has claimed that long term exposure to LED Street-lighting can cause irreparable harm to the retina of the human eye. The Madrid study said this was caused by the high level of radiation in the 'blue band'.
- Artificial night-time lighting has various effects on humans (not to mention wildlife) and exposure to optical radiation affects human physiology and behavior, both directly and indirectly. Many areas are not well understood, and a position statement from the Illuminating Engineering Society (IES) emphasizes mainly the need for further research.
- There is a risk from glare. A French government report published in 2013 indicated that a luminance level higher than 10,000 cd/m2 causes visual discomfort whatever the position of the lighting unit in the field of vision. As the emission surfaces of LEDs are highly concentrated point sources, the luminance of each individual source can be 1000 times higher than the discomfort level. The level of direct radiation from this type of source can therefore easily exceed the level of visual discomfort
