= LED strip light =

Flexible strip of surface mounted light-emitting diodes

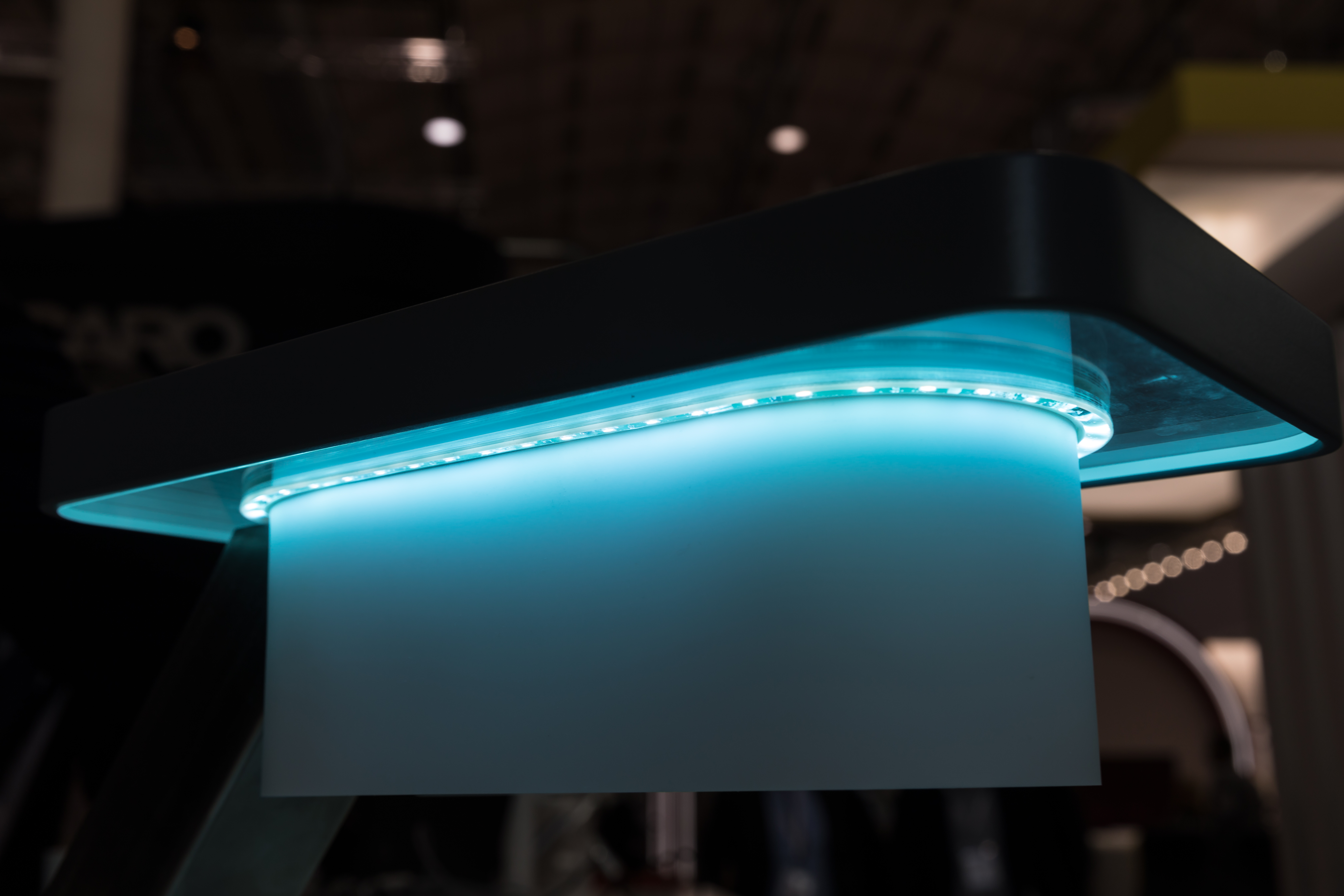
- Several LED spots being reflected as continuous lighting strip
- Component type: LED • strip light
- Working principle: Electroluminescence
- Inventor: Varies (Derived from Nick Holonyak Jr. and Shuji Nakamura's LED inventions)
- First produced: Early 2000s
- Pin names: 2 (Single-color), 3 (CCT), 4 (RGB), 5 (RGBW), 3+ (Addressable/Digital)

Electronic symbol
- Standard schematic symbol for a light-emitting diode

An LED strip light is a flexible circuit board populated by surface-mount LEDs and other components that usually comes with an adhesive backing. LED lamps have been widely adopted in personal, professional, and hobbyist environments for their aesthetic, functionality, and flexibility. Traditionally, strip lights had been used solely in accent lighting, backlighting, task lighting, and decorative lighting applications, such as cove lighting.

LED strip lights were first produced in the early 2000s. Since then, increased luminous efficacy and higher-power SMDs have allowed them to be used in applications such as high brightness task lighting, fluorescent and halogen lighting fixture replacements, indirect lighting applications, ultraviolet inspection during manufacturing processes, set and costume design, and growing plants.

== Design ==
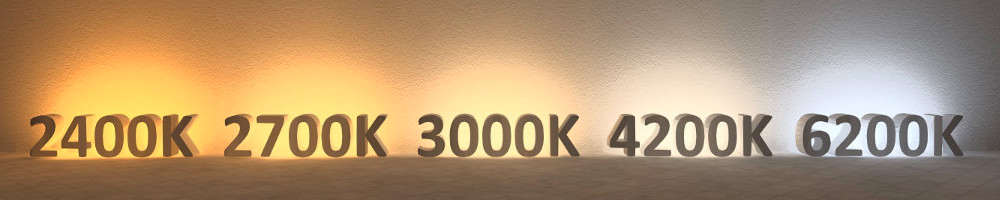
Correlated color temperatures of white light

Variables in strip lighting consist of water resistance, color, adhesives, choice of SMD, driving voltage, control type, and whether it is constant current or constant voltage layout.

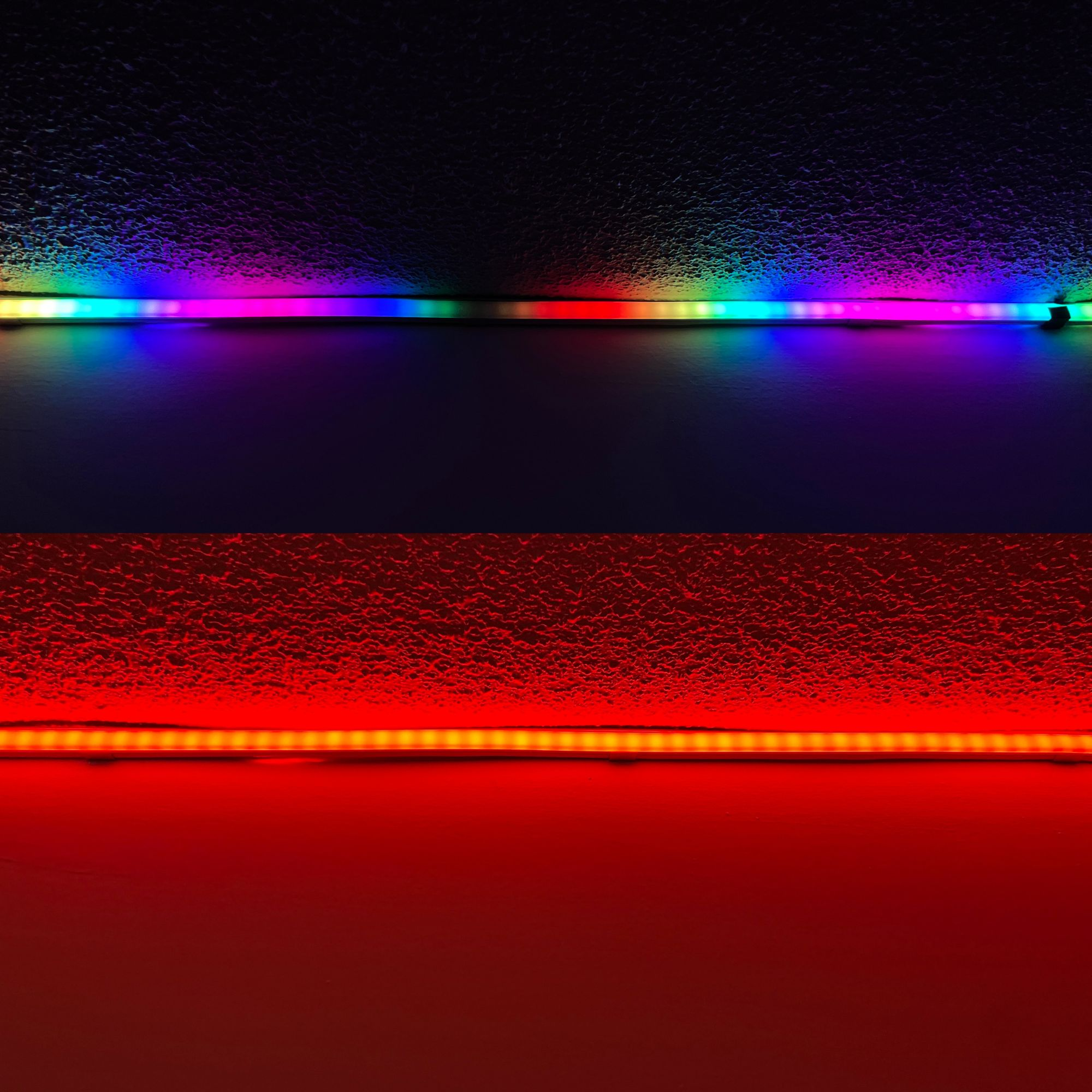
Addressable (top) versus non-addressable (bottom) LED strips

Uncoated LED tape is not considered to have any resistance to water ingress, but may be rated with an ingress protection code as IP20 for some physical ingress resistance. Such tapes are generally low voltage and safe for skin to touch but can be shorted by fine metal objects. Water resistant strip lighting is covered in a heat conducting epoxy or silicone to protect the circuitry from direct contact with water, and can be rated IP65, IP67, or with suitable sealed connections IP68. Both coated and uncoated LED tapes have a two sided adhesive backing to stick to walls, desks, doors, etc.

The most common design differences are in how individual LEDs are controlled, specifically differences in color and whether or not each LED is addressable.

- Single color, non-addressable: Every LED on the strand is a single white colour, typically ranging from 2200K to 6500K in color temperature, or any of several monochrome colors covering the range of the visible spectrum (generally from 400-700 nanometers in wavelength).
- Dynamic tunable white (often described with CCT), non-addressable: Allows the user to adjust the color temperature output from a single strip light. They are manufactured with alternating LEDs of different color temperatures, so half of the LEDs are a lower temperature and half are a higher color temperature, allowing the strip to produce any specific color temperature between the two color temperatures of the LEDs.
- Multicolor, non-addressable: Each LED is capable of displaying red, green, blue, or all three (white), driven by three input power rails. All the LEDs display the same colour at any one time, but the colour can be manipulated by varying the voltage applied to each of the three power inputs.
- RGB, addressable: Multiple colours and addresses. Each LED has its own chip meaning they can be individually triggered for chasing, strobing, colour changing, and other customizable effects.
- RGBW, non-addressable: The combination of single color and multicolor (4 LED-chips) in a single module
- RGBCCT or RGBWW: The combination of dynamic tunable white and multicolor (5 LED-chips) in a single module

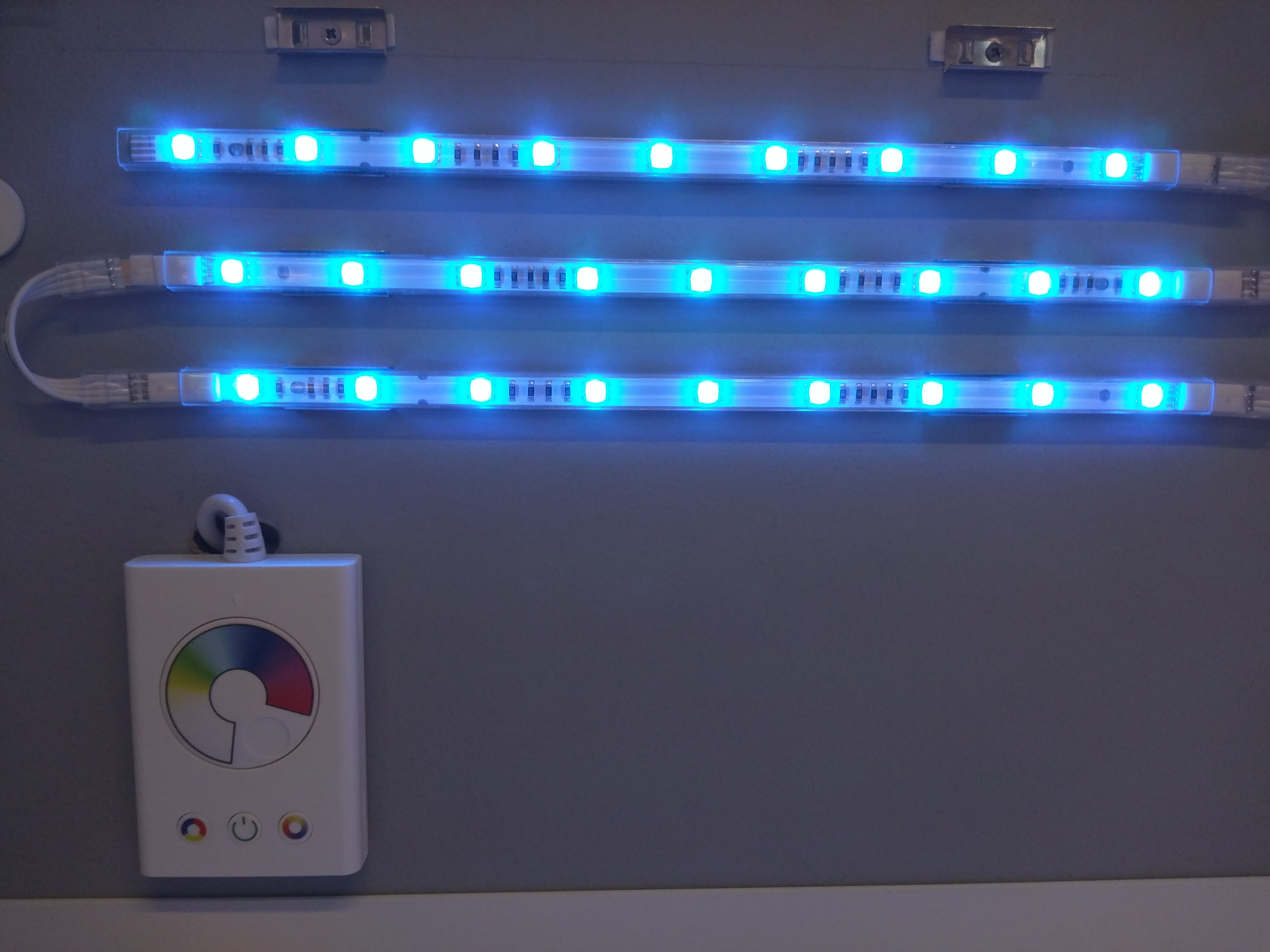
Blue LED strip light with controller

LED strip designs are available populated with many different types of SMD, not only in different colors and addressable or non-addressable, by different shapes, sizes, and power levels. The most common types of SMD are: 3528, single colour, non-addressable, very low power; 5050, containing three LEDs allowing for RGB and addressable strips as well as higher power levels; 2835, a newer single-color SMD having the same surface dimensions as the 3528 but a larger emitter area and a thinner design with an integrated heatsink allowing for higher power levels; 5630/5730, a newer replacement for single-color 5050 SMDs which can operate at slightly higher power levels and have high efficacy. Less common designs may have 3014, 4014, 7020, 8020, or other SMDs. In addition to the LED SMD type, the quantity of LEDs per meter is also an important factor in determining the overall power and brightness.

LED strip lights most commonly operate on 12 or 24 volts of direct current from a power supply, sometimes referred to as a driver. USB strip lights operate on the standard 5-volt direct current used by USB devices. Mains voltage LED strips are also available. These have the advantages of being usable in much longer single runs without a brightness drop along the length, but are less flexible and heavier due to higher voltage and current ratings and thick coatings for shock safety and high IP ratings in their intended outdoor positions, with limited cut points. No separate power supply is needed, although there must be a rectifier between the mains supply and the end of the LED strip.

The most common PCB designs use multiple parallel circuits consisting of passive dropper resistors in series with a certain number of LED SMDs, to operate at a certain current and power level with the expected input voltage. This design is referred to as constant-voltage and is rather sensitive to small variations in input voltage and to the voltage drop that occurs along long lengths of strip when driven from a single power input. Alternative design is the "constant current" design where each parallel circuit of several SMDs includes a small integrated circuit to provide a fixed current to that group of LEDs, within a wide range of applied voltages. This allows the strip to operate at the same power level and brightness along its entire length, or with some variation in the driver voltage.

Any customizations require an LED controller to adjust brightness, color, or individual LED activity. This can be done with an included controller or customized with a microcontroller.

LED strips can also be used to resemble the appearance of traditional neon lights. The LED tape is embedded on the side of a silicone filled, plastic C-channel; the silicone both diffuses the light from the LED tape and directs it out to one side, 90 degrees to the direction the SMD LEDs face. This design allows the lights to be bent in what appears to be the opposite direction to how regular LED tape can be bent, allowing one to spell words and create pictures with it much like neon signs.

=== Models ===
The following is a list of common LED strip models. The IC Control Unit is the "resolution" of control, or the smallest number of LEDs that can be individually controlled in the strip.

LED strip models
Model	Voltage	Color	Individually Addressable?	IC Control Unit (LEDs)	IC Control Structure	Style
WS2801	5V/12V/24V	RGB	Yes	1/3	Built-in & External	Dual Signal Addressable
WS2811	5V/12V/24V	White/RGB/ RGB+W/ RGB+CCT	Partial	1/3/4/6/9	External	Single Signal Addressable
WS2812B	5V	RGB	Yes	1/3/12	Built-in	Single Signal Addressable
WS2813	5V	RGB/RGBW	Yes	1	Built-in	Breakpoint Resume
WS2814	24V	RGBW	Partial	6	External	Single Signal Addressable
WS2815	12V	RGB	Yes	1	Built-in	Breakpoint Resume
WS2818	12V	RGB/RGBW	Partial	3/6	External	Breakpoint Resume
SK6812	5V/12V/24V	White/RGB/ RGBW	Yes	1/3/6	Built-in	Single Signal Addressable
SK9822	5V/12V/24V	RGB	Yes	1	Built-in	Dual Signal Addressable
APA102	5V	White/RGB	Yes	1/3	Built-in & External	Dual Signal Addressable
APA102/HD107S	5V/12V/24V	White/RGB	Yes	1	Built-in	Dual Signal Addressable
APA107			Yes			
HD108			Yes			
UCS1903	5V/12V/24V	RGB	Partial	1/3/6	External	Single Signal Addressable
TM1812	12V/24V	White/RGB/ RGBCCT	Partial	3/6/12	External	Single Signal Addressable
TM1814	12V/24V	RGBW	Partial	6	External	Single Signal Addressable
TM1914	12V/24V	White/RGB	Partial	3/6/7	External	Breakpoint Resume
TM1934			Partial			
TM1936	24V	RGBCCT	Partial	6	External	Single Signal Addressable
LPD8806	12V/24V	RGB	Partial	2	External	Dual Signal Addressable
LPD6803	12V/24V	RGB	Partial	3	External	Dual Signal Addressable
GS8206	12V/24V	RGB	Partial	3/5/6	External	Breakpoint Resume
GS8208	12V	RGB/R/G/B/ Yellow/ GoldenYellow/ W	Yes	1	External	Breakpoint Resume
FW1906			Partial			
SM16703			Partial			
SM16704			Partial			
DMX512	12V	RGB	Yes	1		DMX

=== Controllers and software ===
Addressable LED strips interface with many different controllers and software depending on the application. Hobbyists may use open-source software with microcontrollers, while professionals may utilize dedicated controllers which use the DMX communication protocol. Some commonly used open-source softwares include FastLED, WLED, and Arduino. Microcontrollers commonly used for this include ESP32, ESP8266, Arduino, and Raspberry Pi.

=== Beam angle ===
Some LEDs are rated as having a 120° beam angle, directed "up", i.e. perpendicular to the mounting surface. 'Side view' or 'edge emitter' SMDs are designed such that light is emitted parallel to the adhering surface (i.e., 90 degree difference to typical tape design). These allow the construction of LED strips which wash surfaces within less space or accent edge profiles such as signage.

=== Dimming ===
LEDs can be dimmed efficiently using pulse-width modulation. This strategy rapidly switches the LEDs on and off many times per second by changing the voltage from zero to the designed value in an "on-off" fashion. The LED sees its drive as a square wave. The relative width of the on and off portions of the square wave can be varied so that the LEDs are on or off for relatively more or less time to change brightness. Addressable LEDs do this dimming internally given a data signal which specifies which colour LEDs to turn on, while non-addressable LEDs require an external PWM controller.

== Usage ==
=== Professional ===
LED strips have been used as a germicide in commercial applications, particularly popularized in response to the COVID-19 pandemic. The strips must emit UVC light of 200–280 nm in wavelength, but have been found to be a safe and effective disinfectant.

LED grow lights have been used in research settings and greenhouses to increase the light for photosynthesis or to alter the photoperiod. However, traditional grow lights are sometimes preferred in light of higher initial costs, limited adoption, and lower coverage area with LED grow lights.

LED strips have also found use as a stage lighting instrument. They have been chosen for their ability to create distinct edges, for their dynamic and visually interesting effects, and for their low cost. While the specific strips and controllers used are typically different from home usage, stage lighting strips share many similarities with their domestic counterparts.

=== Hobbyist ===
Video of a bias lighting system with an LED strip light mounted all around the edges at the rear side of a flat screen television set, for extending the picture on the screen to the surrounding walls

The flexibility and energy efficiency of LED strips make them an attractive choice for many hobbyists. Outside of traditional lighting, strip lighting is extensively used in DIY projects or lighted clothing. Examples include computer lighting, costume lights, toys, workspace lighting, monitor and display ambient lighting, and alcove lighting.

LED Strips have recently found popularity as a form of fashion as wearable technology. The ability to power strip lights off of a USB device or battery pack makes them extremely portable and an attractive choice for many designers hoping to integrate new methodologies into their art. Some notable examples include as wearable music-visualizers and as dance harnesses.

Many hobbyists appreciate the interoperability of LED Strips with microcontroller setups. This allows the creation of dynamic visual environments which change in response to the states sent by the microcontroller. Hobbyists have used this to change light setups depending on the noise in the room, with a geo-fence to detect when the user is home, and as a scoreboard.
