= SMD LED =

Surface-mounted device light

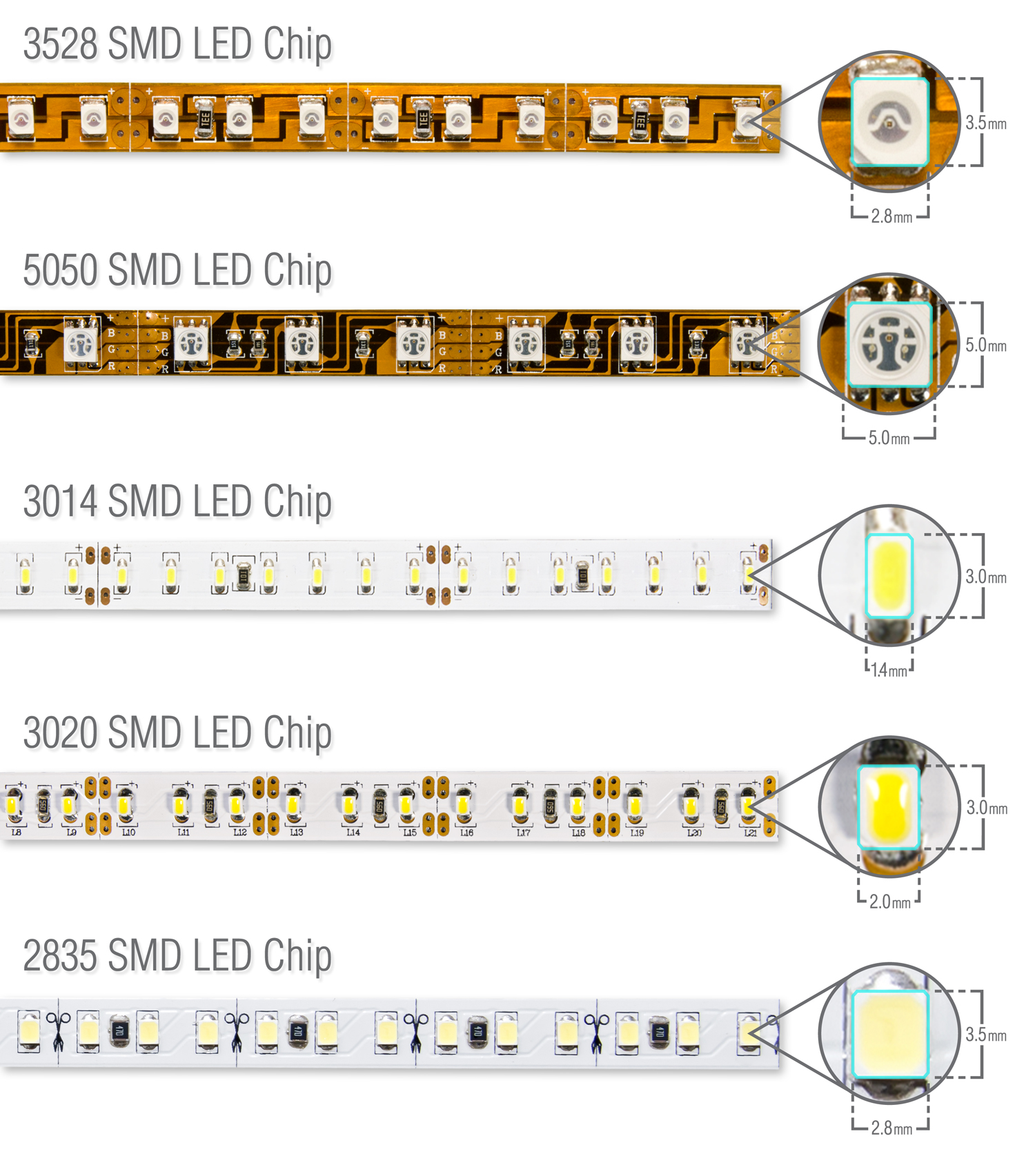
Comparison of SMD LED modules used on an LED strip light

The light from white LED lamps and LED strip lights is usually provided by industry standard surface-mounted device LEDs (SMD LEDs). Non-SMD types of LED lighting also exist, such as COB (chip on board) and MCOB (multi-COB).

Surface-mounted device LED modules are described by the dimensions of the LED package. A single multicolor module may have three individual LEDs within that package, one each of red, green and blue, to allow many colors or shades of white to be selected, by varying the brightness of the individual LEDs. LED brightness may be increased by using a higher driving current, at the cost of reducing the device's lifespan.

SMD LED (module)	Image	Dimensions (mm × mm)	V	mA	Power (watt)	Flux (lumen)	CRI (Ra)	Intensity (candela)	Beam angle (degree)	Heatsink	Efficacy (min) (lm/W)	Efficacy (max) (lm/W)	Colors per SMD package
8520	8520 SMD LED	8.5 × 2.0			0.5 & 1	55–60	80				110	120	Monochrome
7020		7.0 × 2.0			0.5 & 1	40–55	75–85				80	110	Monochrome
7014		7.0 × 1.4			0.5 & 1	35–50	70–80				70	100	Monochrome
5736		5.7 × 3.6			0.5	40–55	80	15–18	120	no	80	110	
5733		5.7 × 3.3			0.5	35–50	80	15–18	120	no	70	100	
5730		5.7 × 3.0			0.5	30–45	75	15–18	120	no	60	90	
5630		5.6 × 3.0			0.5	30–45	70	18.4	120	no	60	90	
5060		5.0 × 6.0			0.2	26				no	130		Monochrome or RGB
5050		5.0 × 5.0			0.2	24				no	120		Monochrome or RGB
4014		4.0 × 1.4			0.2	22–32	75–85				110	160	
3535		3.5 × 3.5			0.5	35–42	75–80				70	84	
3528		3.5 × 2.8			0.06–0.08	4–8	60–70	3	120	no	70	100	
3030		3.0 × 3.0			0.9	110–120					120	130	
3020		3.0 × 2.0			0.06	5.4		2.5	120	no	80	90	
3014		3.0 × 1.4			0.1	9–12	75–85	2.1–3.5	120	yes	90	120	
2835		2.8 × 3.5			0.2	14–25	75–85	8.4–9.1	120	yes	70	125	
1616		1.6 × 1.6											
1206		1.2 × 0.6				3–6	55–60						
1104		1.1 × 0.4											

== See also ==
- Chip on board (COB), opposite LED structure
