= Lumen maintenance =

LED light gauge

Lumen maintenance is a gauge to determine the lifetime or useful light output rating of an LED light source. Unlike traditional light sources such as incandescent lamps, LEDs rarely fail outright and instead continue to emit light, albeit at slowly diminishing rate over time. Lumen maintenance is the luminous flux remaining (expressed as a percentage of the initial output) at any selected elapsed operating time. Lumen depreciation is the luminous flux lost over time, and thus the complement of lumen maintenance.

Lumen maintenance compares the amount of light produced from a light source or from a luminaire when it is brand new to the amount of light output at a specific time in the future. For instance, if a luminaire produced 1,000 lumens of light when it was brand new and now produces 700 lumens of light after 30,000 hours, then it would have lumen maintenance of 70% at 30,000 hours. Useful lifetime estimates for LED lighting products are typically given in terms of the expected operating hours until light output has diminished to 70% of initial levels (denoted L_{70} life). This percentage was favored because research indicates that most users fail to notice the slow loss of light until well after it passes the 70% mark. However, many lighting designers have pointed out that a 30% loss of light is pretty poor performance and some manufacturers have responded by providing L80, and even L90, data (that is, the life until the LED has lost 10% of its initial brightness).

There are a number of methods for controlling lumen maintenance areas:

- Installing photoreceptors tied directly to ballasts, controlling the voltage output to the lamps based on the set level of luminance.
- Connecting dimming ballasts directly to an energy management system that has been programmed for the expected depreciation of the lamps; the energy management system directs the output of ballasts as necessary to maintain required lighting levels over time.
- Manually verifying lighting levels in a space by using photometers in specific locations, and then manually setting the system to meet lighting requirements.

== Lumen maintenance degradation mechanisms ==
One mechanism is the degradation of the LED chip due to the increase of non-radiative recombination which reduces the total number of emitted photons. The other predominant mechanism is the degradation of the optical parts under temperature or electric stresses. If an LED is in the presence of volatile organic compounds (VOCs), then VOCs can diffuse into the gas-permeable silicone lens and encapsulants. The VOCs will occupy the free space in the molecular structure of the silicone. Once exposed to high photonic energy emitted by the LED and heat from the junction temperature, the VOCs start to discolor and deteriorate the LED, by through the phosphor layer.

== Lumen maintenance standards ==
=== IES LM-80 ===
IESNA LM-80 is the Department of Energy (DOE) approved testing method for measuring lumen depreciation of solid-state (LED) light sources, arrays and modules. The Illuminating Engineering Society (IES) and the Department of Energy Solid State Lighting Standards Development group worked together to create the LM-80 test criteria. The IESNA LM-80 committee is chaired by Jeff Hulett, CTO at Vektrex Electronic Systems Inc., who continues to work with the group to update and improve the LM-80 standard. Following the release of the original LM-80 standard in 2008, the LM-80 working group released two additional updates: LM-80-08 and LM-80-15. LM-80-15 expanded the standard to include radiant, photon or luminous flux maintenance.

LM-80 is for inorganic LED-based packages, arrays and modules, not LED bulbs or luminaries. It mainly measures:

1. Lumen maintenance of light source in different temperature
2. Color maintenance of light source in different temperature.

LM-80 specifies a minimum testing period of 6,000 hours, with 10,000 hours being the preferred testing period. LM-80 also requires testing at a minimum of 1,000-hour increments.

=== IES TM-21 ===
While LM-80 provides a standard method for testing lumen maintenance, it does not provide guidance or recommendations for predicting or extrapolating maintenance beyond the duration of these measurements. The need for this additional level of guidance was addressed in 2011 when the IES published TM-21: Lumen Degradation Lifetime Estimation Method for LED Light Sources, the IES-recommended method for projecting the lumen degradation of an LED package, array or module beyond the LM-80 test period. TM-21 is now the standard method for projecting useful LED lighting product life at realistic operating temperatures. Once the LM-80 test is complete, the resultant measurements are used to determine a depreciation curve for the luminous flux at each tested temperature. The data is used as described in TM-21 to determine the L70, L80 or L90 “Lumen Maintenance Life Projection.” In other words, LM-80 is a testing procedure, and TM-21 is a calculation procedure.
