= Color rendering index =

Accuracy of light source in showing color of objects

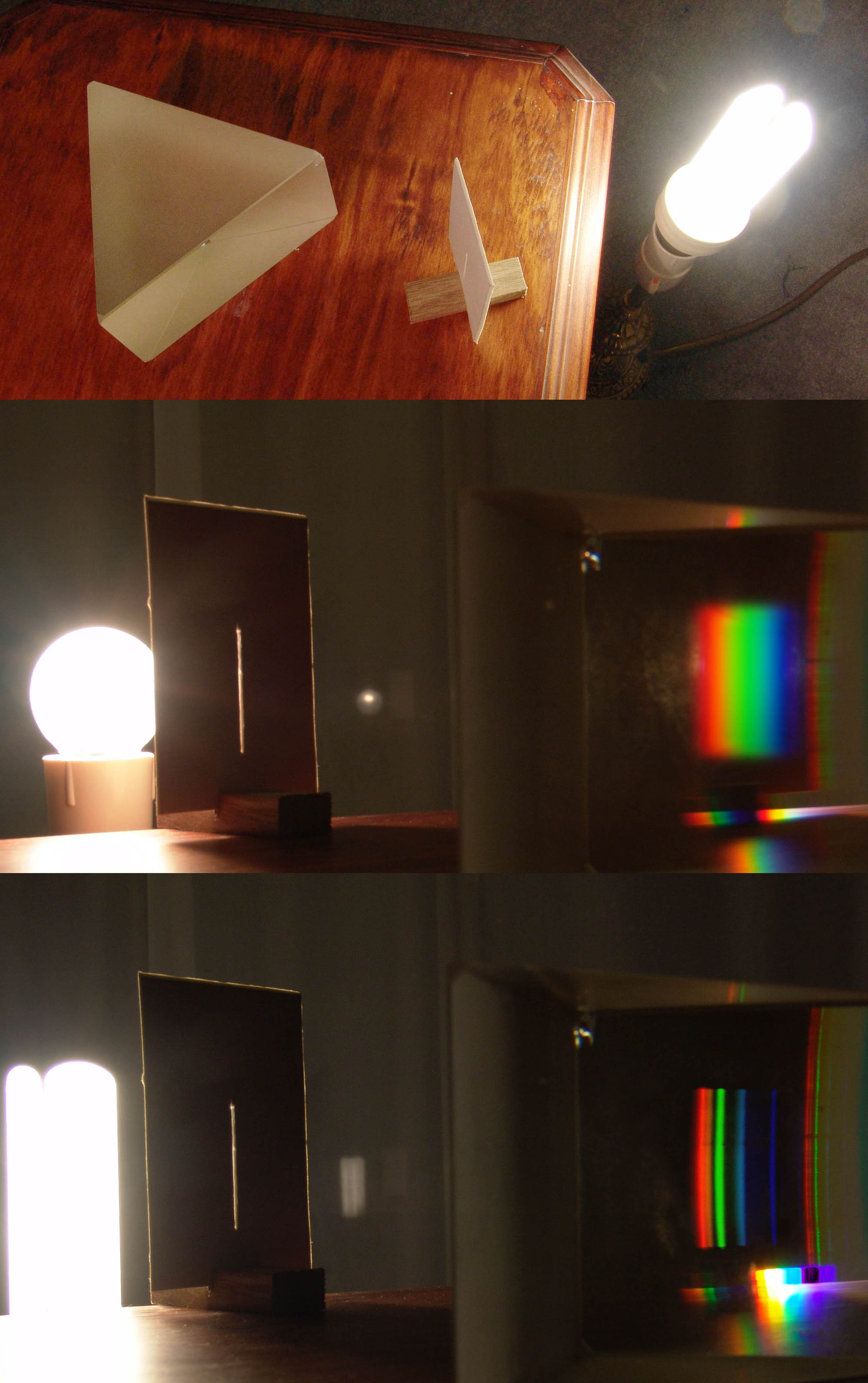
Emitted light spectrum determines the CRI of the lamp. An incandescent lamp (middle image) has a continuous spectrum and therefore a higher CRI than a fluorescent lamp (lower image). The top image shows the setup of the demonstration from above.

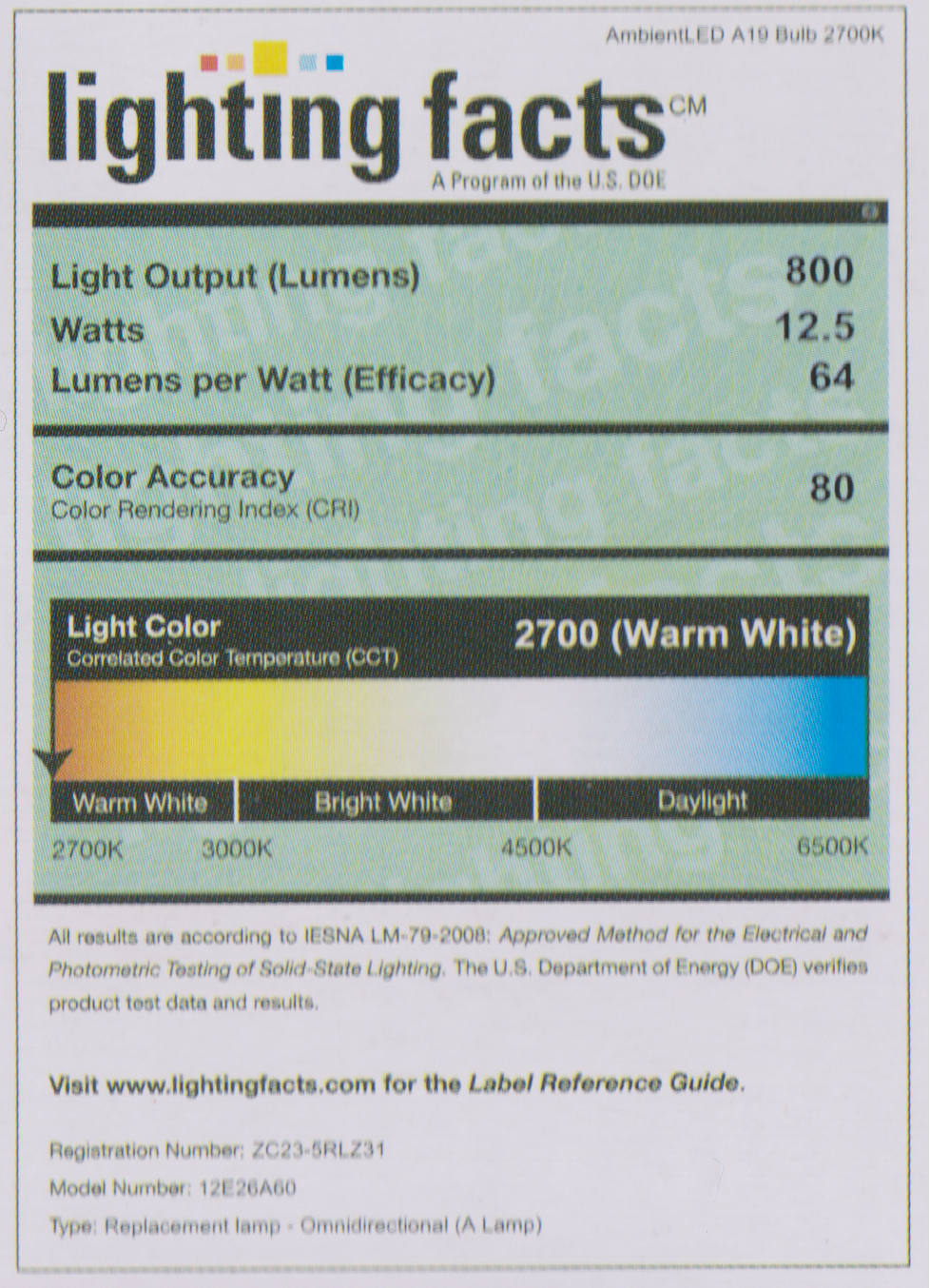
Color rendering index shown as color accuracy

A color rendering index (CRI) is a quantitative measure of the ability of a light source to reveal the colors of various objects faithfully in comparison with a natural or standard light source.

Color rendering, as defined by the International Commission on Illumination (CIE), is the effect of an illuminant on the color appearance of objects by conscious or subconscious comparison with their color appearance under a reference or standard illuminant.

The CRI of a light source does not indicate the apparent color of the light source; that information is given by the correlated color temperature (CCT). The CRI is determined by the light source's spectrum. An incandescent lamp has a spectrum approximating that of a black body emitter, while a fluorescent lamp has an irregular emission spectrum with multiple relatively narrow peaks, which suggests that the incandescent lamp should have the higher CRI.

The value often quoted as "CRI" on commercially available lighting products is properly called the CIE R_{a} value, "CRI" being a general term and CIE R_{a} being the international standard color rendering index.

Numerically, the highest possible CIE R_{a} value is 100 and would only be given to a source whose spectrum is identical to the spectrum of daylight, very close to that of a black body (incandescent lamps are effectively black bodies), dropping to negative values for some light sources. Low-pressure sodium lighting has a negative CRI; fluorescent lights range from about 50 for the basic types, up to about 98 for the best multi-phosphor type. Typical white-color LEDs have a CRI of 80 or more, while some manufacturers claim that their LEDs achieve a CRI of up to 98.

CIE R_{a}'s ability to predict color appearance has been criticized in favor of measures based on color appearance models, such as CIECAM02 and for daylight simulators, the CIE metamerism index. CRI is not a good indicator for use in visual assessment of light sources, especially for sources below 5000 kelvin (K). New standards, such as the IES TM-30, resolve these issues and have begun replacing the usage of CRI among professional lighting designers. However, CRI is still common among household lighting products.

== History ==
Researchers use daylight as the benchmark to which to compare color rendering of electric lights. In 1948, daylight was described as the ideal source of illumination for good color rendering because "it (daylight) displays (1) a great variety of colors, (2) makes it easy to distinguish slight shades of color, and (3) the colors of objects around us obviously look natural".

Around the middle of the 20th century, color scientists took an interest in assessing the ability of artificial lights to accurately reproduce colors. European researchers attempted to describe illuminants by measuring the spectral power distribution (SPD) in "representative" spectral bands, whereas their North American counterparts studied the colorimetric effect of the illuminants on reference objects.

The CIE assembled a committee to study the matter and accepted the proposal to use the latter approach, which has the virtue of not needing spectrophotometry, with a set of Munsell samples. Eight samples of varying hue would be alternately lit with two illuminants, and the color appearance compared. Since no color appearance model existed at the time, it was decided to base the evaluation on color differences in a suitable color space, CIEUVW. In 1931, the CIE adopted the first formal system of colorimetry, which is based on the trichromatic nature of the human visual system. CRI is based upon this system of colorimetry.

To deal with the problem of having to compare light sources of different correlated color temperatures (CCT), the CIE settled on using a reference black body with the same color temperature for lamps with a CCT of under 5000 K, or a phase of CIE standard illuminant D (daylight) otherwise. This presented a continuous range of color temperatures to choose a reference from. Any chromaticity difference between the source and reference illuminants were to be abridged with a von Kries-type chromatic adaptation transform. There are two extant versions of CRI: the more commonly used R_{a} of CIE (1995) (actually from 1974) and R96_{a} of CIE (1999).

== Test method ==
The CRI is calculated by comparing the color rendering of the test source to that of a "perfect" source, which is a black-body radiator for sources with correlated color temperatures under 5000 K, and a phase of daylight otherwise (e.g., D65). Chromatic adaptation should be performed so that like quantities are compared. The Test Method (also called Test Sample Method or Test Color Method) needs only colorimetric, rather than spectrophotometric, information.

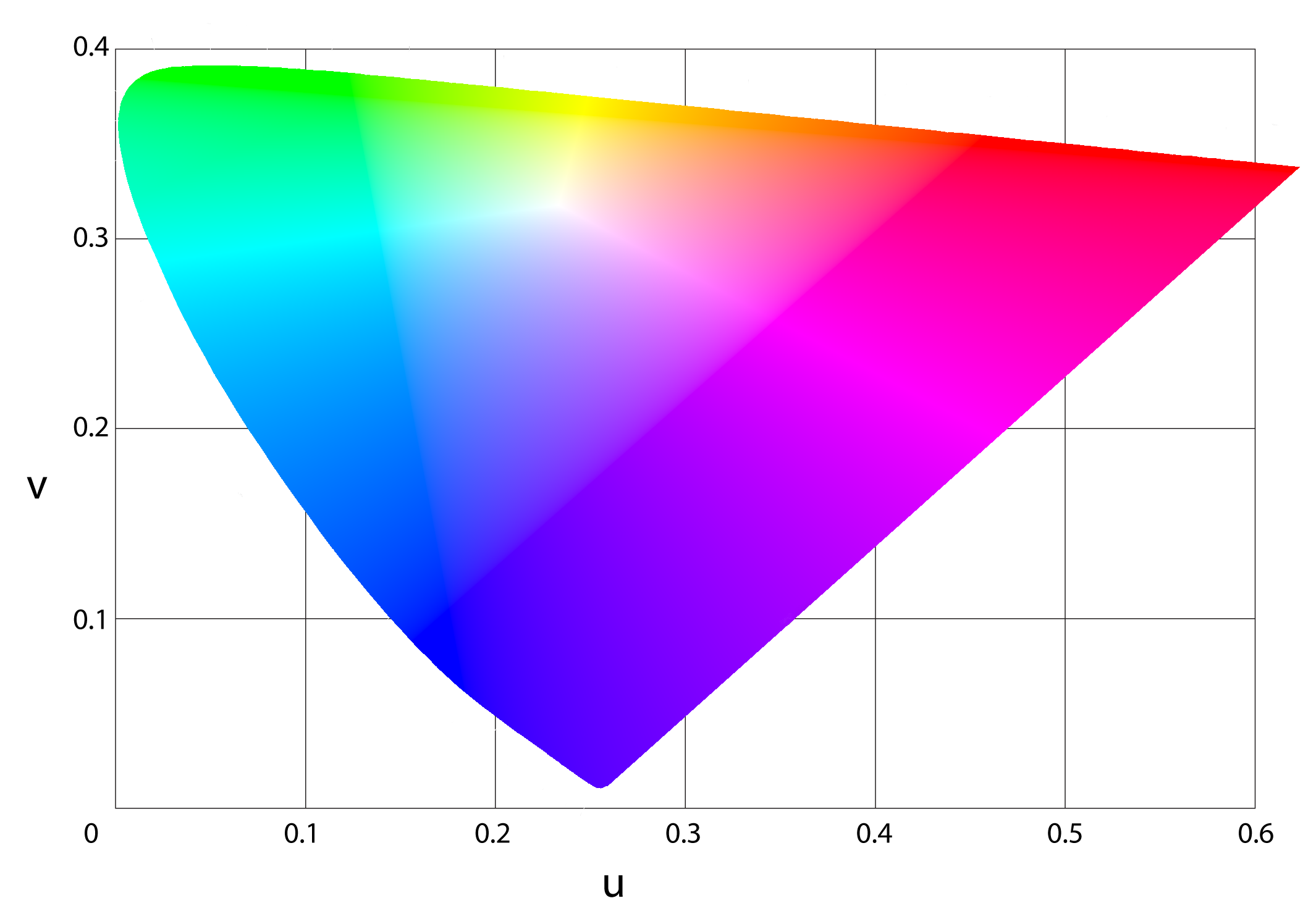
CIE 1960 UCS. Planckian locus and co-ordinates of several illuminants shown in illustration below.

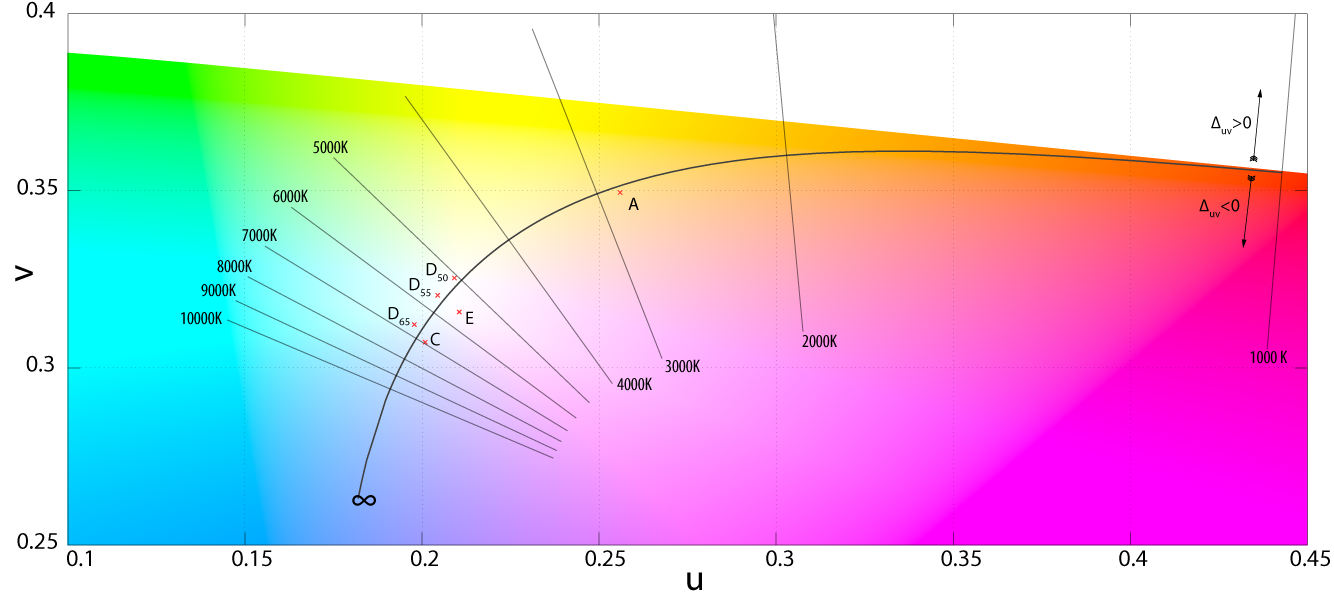
(u, v) chromaticity diagram with several CIE illuminants

1. Using the 2° standard observer, find the chromaticity co-ordinates of the test source in the CIE 1960 color space.
2. Determine the correlated color temperature (CCT) of the test source by finding the closest point to the Planckian locus on the (u, v) chromaticity diagram.
3. If the test source has a CCT < 5000 K, use a black body for reference, otherwise use CIE standard illuminant D. Both sources should have the same CCT.
4. Ensure that the chromaticity distance (DC) of the test source to the Planckian locus is under 5.4×10^{−3} in the CIE 1960 UCS. This ensures the meaningfulness of the result, as the CRI is only defined for light sources that are approximately white. $\text{DC} = \Delta_{uv} = \sqrt{(u_r - u_t)^2 + (v_r - v_t)^2}.$
5. Illuminate the first eight standard samples, from the fifteen listed below, alternately using both sources.
6. Using the 2° standard observer, find the co-ordinates of the light reflected by each sample in the CIE 1964 color space.
7. Chromatically adapt each sample by a Von Kries transform.
8. For each sample, calculate the Euclidean distance $\Delta E_i$ between the pair of co-ordinates.
9. Calculate the special (i.e., particular) CRI using the formula $R_i = 100 - 4.6 \Delta E_i$
10. Find the general CRI (R_{a}) by calculating the arithmetic mean of the special CRIs.

Note that the last three steps are equivalent to finding the mean color difference, $\Delta \bar{E}_{UVW}$ and using that to calculate $R_a$:

$$R_a = 100 - 4.6 \Delta \bar{E}_{UVW}.$$

=== Chromatic adaptation ===
Chromatic adaptation of TCSs lit by CIE FL4 (short, black vectors, to indicate before and after) to a black body of 2940 K (cyan circles)

CIE (1995) uses this von Kries chromatic transform equation to find the corresponding color (u_{c,i}, v_{c,i}) for each sample. The mixed subscripts (t, i) refer to the inner product of the test illuminant spectrum and the spectral reflexivity of sample i:

$$u_{c,i} = \frac{10.872 + 0.404 (c_r/c_t) c_{t,i} - 4 (d_r/d_t) d_{t,i}}{16.518 + 1.481 (c_r/c_t) c_{t,i} - (d_r/d_t) d_{t,i}},$$

$$v_{c,i} = \frac{5.520}{16.518 + 1.481 (c_r/c_t) c_{t,i} - (d_r/d_t) d_{t,i}},$$

$$c = (4.0 - u - 10.0 v) / v,$$

$$d = (1.708 v - 1.481 u + 0.404) / v,$$

where subscripts r and t refer to reference and test light sources respectively.

=== Test color samples ===
Name	Appr. Munsell	Appearance under daylight	Swatch
TCS01	7,5 R 6/4	Light grayish red	
TCS02	5 Y 6/4	Dark grayish yellow	
TCS03	5 GY 6/8	Strong yellow green	
TCS04	2,5 G 6/6	Moderate yellowish green	
TCS05	10 BG 6/4	Light bluish green	
TCS06	5 PB 6/8	Light blue	
TCS07	2,5 P 6/8	Light violet	
TCS08	10 P 6/8	Light reddish purple	
TCS09	4,5 R 4/13	Strong red	
TCS10	5 Y 8/10	Strong yellow	
TCS11	4,5 G 5/8	Strong green	
TCS12	3 PB 3/11	Strong blue	
TCS13	5 YR 8/4	Light yellowish pink	
TCS14	5 GY 4/4	Moderate olive green (leaf)	

As specified in CIE (1995), the original test color samples (TCS) are taken from an early edition of the Munsell Atlas. The first eight samples, a subset of the eighteen proposed in Nickerson (1960), are relatively low saturated colors and are evenly distributed over the complete range of hues. These eight samples are employed to calculate the general color rendering index $R_a$. The last six samples provide supplementary information about the color rendering properties of the light source; the first four for high saturation, and the last two as representatives of well-known objects. The reflectance spectra of these samples may be found in CIE (2004), and their approximate Munsell notations are listed aside.

== R96_{a} method ==

In the CIE's 1991 Quadrennial Meeting, Technical Committee 1-33 (Color Rendering) was assembled to work on updating the color rendering method, as a result of which the R96_{a} method was developed. The committee was dissolved in 1999, releasing CIE (1999), but no firm recommendations, partly due to disagreements between researchers and manufacturers.

The R96_{a} method has a few distinguishing features:

- A new set of test color samples
- Six reference illuminants: D65, D50, black bodies of 4200 K, 3450 K, 2950 K, and 2700 K.
- A new chromatic adaptation transform: CIECAT94.
- Color difference evaluation in CIELAB.
- Adaptation of all colors to D65 (since CIELAB is well-tested under D65).

It is conventional to use the original method; R96_{a} should be explicitly mentioned if used.

=== New test color samples ===
	TCS01^{*}	TCS02^{*}	TCS03^{*}	TCS04^{*}	TCS05^{*}	TCS06^{*}	TCS07^{*}	TCS08^{*}	TCS09^{*}	TCS10^{*}
L^{*}	40.9	61.1	81.6	72.0	55.7	51.7	30.0	51.0	68.7	63.9
a^{*}	51.0	28.8	−4.2	−29.4	−43.4	−26.4	23.2	47.3	14.2	11.7
b^{*}	26.3	57.9	80.3	58.9	35.6	−24.6	−49.6	−13.8	17.4	17.3

As discussed in Sándor & Schanda (2005), CIE (1999) recommends the use of a ColorChecker chart owing to the obsolescence of the original samples, of which only metameric matches remain. In addition to the eight ColorChart samples, two skin tone samples are defined (TCS09^{*} and TCS10^{*}). Accordingly, the updated general CRI is averaged over ten samples, not eight as before. Nevertheless, Hung (2002) has determined that the patches in CIE (1995) give better correlations for any color difference than the ColorChecker chart, whose samples are not equally distributed in a uniform color space.

== Example ==
The CRI can also be theoretically derived from the spectral power distribution (SPD) of the illuminant and samples, since physical copies of the original color samples are difficult to find. In this method, care should be taken to use a sampling resolution fine enough to capture spikes in the SPD. The SPDs of the standard test colors are tabulated in 5 nm increments CIE (2004), so it is suggested to use interpolation up to the resolution of the illuminant's spectrophotometry.

Starting with the SPD, let us verify that the CRI of reference illuminant F4 is 51. The first step is to determine the tristimulus values using the 1931 standard observer. Calculation of the inner product of the SPD with the standard observer's color matching functions (CMFs) yields (X, Y, Z) = (109.2, 100.0, 38.9) (after normalizing for Y = 100). From this follow the xy chromaticity values:

The tight isotherms are from 2935 K to 2945 K. FL4 marked with a cross.

$$x = \frac{109.2}{109.2 + 100.0 + 38.9} = 0.4402,$$

$$y = \frac{100}{109.2 + 100.0 + 38.9} = 0.4031.$$

The next step is to convert these chromaticities to the CIE 1960 UCS in order to be able to determine the CCT:

$$u = \frac{4 \times 0.4402}{-2 \times 0.4402 + 12 \times 0.4031 + 3} = 0.2531,$$

$$v = \frac{6 \times 0.4031}{-2 \times 0.4402 + 12 \times 0.4031 + 3} = 0.3477.$$

Relative SPD of FL4 and a black body of equal CCT. Not normalized.

Examining the CIE 1960 UCS reveals this point to be closest to 2938 K on the Planckian locus, which has a coordinate of (0.2528, 0.3484). The distance of the test point to the locus is under the limit (5.4×10^{−3}), so we can continue the procedure, assured of a meaningful result:

$$\begin{align}
\text{DC} &= \sqrt{(0.2531 - 0.2528)^2 + (0.3477 - 0.3484)^2} \\
&= 8.12 \times 10^{-4} < 5.4 \times 10^{-3}.
\end{align}$$

We can verify the CCT by using McCamy's approximation algorithm to estimate the CCT from the xy chromaticities:

$$\text{CCT}_\text{est.} = -449 n^3 + 3525 n^2 - 6823.3 n + 5520.33,$$

where $n = \frac{x - 0.3320}{y - 0.1858}$.

Substituting $(x, y) = (0.4402, 0.4031)$ yields n = 0.4979 and CCT_{est.} = 2941 K, which is close enough. (Robertson's method can be used for greater precision, but we will be content with 2940 K in order to replicate published results.) Since 2940 < 5000, we select a Planckian radiator of 2940 K as the reference illuminant.

The next step is to determine the values of the test color samples under each illuminant in the CIEUVW color space. This is done by integrating the product of the CMF with the SPDs of the illuminant and the sample, then converting from CIEXYZ to CIEUVW (with the u, v coordinates of the reference illuminant as white point):

Illuminant		TCS1	TCS2	TCS3	TCS4	TCS5	TCS6	TCS7	TCS8
Reference	U	39.22	17.06	−13.94	−40.83	−35.55	−23.37	16.43	44.64
Reference	V	2.65	9.00	14.97	7.88	−2.86	−13.94	−12.17	−8.01
Reference	W	62.84	61.08	61.10	58.11	59.16	58.29	60.47	63.77
CIE FL4	U	26.56	10.71	−14.06	−27.45	−22.74	−13.99	9.61	25.52
CIE FL4	V	3.91	11.14	17.06	9.42	−3.40	−17.40	−15.71	-10.23
CIE FL4	W	63.10	61.78	62.30	57.54	58.46	56.45	59.11	61.69
CIE FL4 (CAT)	U	26.34	10.45	−14.36	−27.78	−23.10	−14.33	9.37	25.33
CIE FL4 (CAT)	V	4.34	11.42	17.26	9.81	−2.70	−16.44	−14.82	−9.47
CIE FL4 (CAT)	W	63.10	61.78	62.30	57.54	58.46	56.45	59.11	61.69

From this we can calculate the color difference between the chromatically adapted samples (labeled "CAT") and those illuminated by the reference. (The Euclidean metric is used to calculate the color difference in CIEUVW.) The special CRI is simply $R_i = 100 - 4.6 \Delta E_{UVW}$.

	TCS1	TCS2	TCS3	TCS4	TCS5	TCS6	TCS7	TCS8
$\Delta E_{UVW}$	12.99	7.07	2.63	13.20	12.47	9.56	7.66	19.48
R_{i}	40.2	67.5	87.9	39.3	42.6	56.0	64.8	10.4

Finally, the general color rendering index is the mean of the special CRIs: 51.

The cyan circles indicate the TCS under the reference illuminant. The short, black, vectors indicate the TCS under the test illuminant, before and after chromatic adaptation transformation (CAT). (The vectors are short because the white points are close.) The post-CAT end of the vector lies NW, mirroring the chromaticity vector between the reference and test illuminants. The special CRIs are reflected in the length of the dotted lines linking the chromaticities of the samples under the reference and chromatically adapted test illuminants, respectively. Short distances, as in the case of TCS3, result in a high special CRI (87.9), whereas long distances, as in the case of TCS8, result in a low special CRI (10.4). In simpler terms, TCS3 reproduces better under FL4 than does TCS8 (relative to a black body).

== Typical values ==
Light source	CCT (K)	CRI R_{a}
Low-pressure sodium (LPS/SOX)	1800	−44
Clear mercury-vapor	6410	17
High-pressure sodium (HPS/SON)	2100	24
Coated mercury-vapor	3600	49
Halophosphate warm-white fluorescent	2940	51
Halophosphate cool-white fluorescent	4230	64
Tri-phosphor warm-white fluorescent	2940	73
Halophosphate cool-daylight fluorescent	6430	76
"White" SON	2700	82
Standard LED Lamp	2700–5000	83
Quartz metal halide	4200	85
Tri-phosphor cool-white fluorescent	4080	89
High-CRI LED lamp (blue LED)	2700–5000	95
Ceramic discharge metal-halide lamp	5400	96
Ultra-high-CRI LED lamp (violet LED)	2700–5000	99
Incandescent/halogen bulb	3200	100

A reference source, such as black-body radiation, is defined as having a CRI of 100. This is why incandescent lamps have that rating, as they are, in effect, almost black-body radiators. The best possible faithfulness to a reference is specified by CRI = 100, while the very poorest is specified by a CRI below zero. A high CRI by itself does not imply a good rendition of color, because the reference itself may have an imbalanced SPD if it has an extreme color temperature.

== Special value: R9 ==
R_{a} is the average value of R1–R8; other values from R9 to R15 are not used in the calculation of R_{a}, including R9 "saturated red", R13 "skin color (light)", and R15 "skin color (medium)", which are all difficult colors to faithfully reproduce. R9 is a vital index in high-CRI lighting, as many applications require red lights, such as film and video lighting, medical lighting, art lighting, etc. However, in the general CRI (R_{a}) calculation R9 is not included.

R9 is one of the numbers of R_{i} refers to test color samples (TCS), which is one score in extended CRI. It is the number rates the light source's color revealing ability towards TCS 09. And it describes the specific ability of light to accurately reproduce the red color of objects. Many lights manufacturers or retailers do not point out the score of R9, while it is a vital value to evaluate the color rendition performance for film and video lighting, as well as any applications that need high CRI value. So, generally, it is regarded as a supplement of color rendering index when evaluating a high-CRI light source.

R9 value, TCS 09, or in other words, the red color is the key color for many lighting applications, such as film and video lighting, textile printing, image printing, skin tone, medical lighting, and so on. Besides, many other objects which are not in red color, but actually consists of different colors including red color. For instance, the skin tone is impacted by the blood under the skin, which means that the skin tone also includes red color, although it looks much like close to white or light yellow. So, if the R9 value is not good enough, the skin tone under this light will be more paleness or even greenish in your eyes or cameras.

== Criticism ==
Ohno and others have criticized CRI for not always correlating well with subjective color rendering quality in practice, particularly for light sources with spiky emission spectra such as fluorescent lamps or white LEDs. Another problem is that the CRI is discontinuous at 5000 K, because the chromaticity of the reference moves from the Planckian locus to the CIE daylight locus. Davis & Ohno (2006) identify several other issues, which they address in their color quality scale (CQS):

- The color space in which the color distance is calculated (CIEUVW) is obsolete and nonuniform. Use CIELAB or CIELUV instead.
- The chromatic adaptation transform used (Von Kries transform) is inadequate. Use CMCCAT2000 or CIECAT02 instead.
- Calculating the arithmetic mean of the errors diminishes the contribution of any single large deviation. Two light sources with similar CRI may perform significantly differently if one has a particularly low special CRI in a spectral band that is important for the application. Use the root-mean-square deviation instead.
- The metric is not perceptual; all errors are equally weighted, whereas humans favor certain errors over others. A color can be more saturated or less saturated without a change in the numerical value of ∆E_{i}, while in general a saturated color is experienced as being more attractive.
- A negative CRI is difficult to interpret. Normalize the scale from 0 to 100 using the formula $R_\text{out} = 10 \ln \left[\exp(R_\text{in}/10) + 1\right]$.
- The CRI cannot be calculated for light sources that do not have a CCT (non-white light).
- Eight samples are not enough since manufacturers can optimize the emission spectra of their lamps to reproduce them faithfully, but otherwise perform poorly. Use more samples (they suggest fifteen for CQS).
- The samples are not saturated enough to pose difficulty for reproduction.
- CRI merely measures the faithfulness of any illuminant to an ideal source with the same CCT, but the ideal source itself may not render colors well if it has an extreme color temperature, due to a lack of energy at either short or long wavelengths (i.e., it may be excessively blue or red). Weight the result by the ratio of the gamut area of the polygon formed by the fifteen samples in CIELAB for 6500 K to the gamut area for the test source. 6500 K is chosen for reference since it has a relatively even distribution of energy over the visible spectrum and hence high gamut area. This normalizes the multiplication factor.

=== Alternatives ===
CIE (2007) "reviews the applicability of the CIE color rendering index to white LED light sources based on the results of visual experiments". Chaired by Davis, CIE TC 1-69(C) is currently investigating "new methods for assessing the color rendition properties of white-light sources used for illumination, including solid-state light sources, with the goal of recommending new assessment procedures [...] by March, 2010".

For a comprehensive review of alternative color rendering indexes see Guo & Houser (2004).

Smet (2011) reviewed several alternative quality metrics and compared their performance based on visual data obtained in nine psychophysical experiments. It was found that a geometric mean of the GAI index and the CIE Ra correlated best with naturalness (r=0.85), while a color quality metric based on memory colors (MCRI) correlated best for preference (r = 0.88). The differences in performance of these metrics with the other tested metrics (CIE Ra; CRI-CAM02UCS; CQS; RCRI; GAI; geomean (GAI, CIE Ra); CSA; Judd Flattery; Thornton CPI; MCRI) were found to be statistically significant with p < 0.0001.

Dangol, et al., performed psychophysical experiments and concluded that people's judgments of naturalness and overall preference could not be predicted with a single measure, but required the joint use of a fidelity-based measure (e.g., Qp) and a gamut-based measure (e.g., Qg or GAI.). They carried out further experiments in real offices evaluating various spectra generated for combination existing and proposed color rendering metrics.

Due to the criticisms of CRI many researchers have developed alternative metrics, though relatively few of them have had wide adoption.

==== Gamut area index (GAI) ====
Developed in 2010 by Rea and Freyssinier, the gamut area index (GAI) is an attempt to improve over the flaws found in the CRI. They have shown that the GAI is better than the CRI at predicting color discrimination on standardized Farnsworth-Munsell 100 Hue Tests and that GAI is predictive of color saturation. Proponents of using GAI claim that, when used in conjunction with CRI, this method of evaluating color rendering is preferred by test subjects over light sources that have high values of only one measure. Researchers recommend a lower and an upper limit to GAI. Use of LED technology has called for a new way to evaluate color rendering because of the unique spectrum of light created by these technologies. Preliminary tests have shown that the combination of GAI and CRI used together is a preferred method for evaluating color rendering.

==== Color quality scale (CQS) ====
Pousset, Obein & Razet (2010) developed a psychophysical experiment in order to evaluate light quality of LED lightings. It is based on colored samples used in the "color quality scale". Predictions of the CQS and results from visual measurements were compared.

== Film and video high-CRI LED lighting ==
Problems have been encountered attempting to use LED lighting on film and video sets. The color spectra of LED lighting primary colors does not match the expected color wavelength bandpasses of film emulsions and digital sensors. As a result, color rendition can be completely unpredictable in optical prints, transfers to digital media from film (DIs), and video camera recordings. This phenomenon with respect to motion picture film has been documented in an LED lighting evaluation series of tests produced by the Academy of Motion Picture Arts and Sciences scientific staff.

To that end, various other metrics such as the TLCI (television lighting consistency index) have been developed to replace the human observer with a camera observer. Similar to the CRI, the metric measures quality of a light source as it would appear on camera on a scale from 0 to 100. Some manufacturers say that their products have TLCI values of up to 99.

== Sources ==
- "Colour rendering (TC 1-33 closing remarks)", Commission internationale de l'éclairage, Publication 135/2, 1999, archived from the original on 2008-09-22
- "CIE Colorimetric and Colour Rendering Tables", Commission internationale de l'éclairage, 2004, archived from the original on 2008-03-05
- Colour rendering of white LED light sources (PDF), Publication 177:2007, Vienna: CIE Central Bureau, 2007, ISBN 978-3-901906-57-2 – via Schweizer Licht Gesellschaft. Carried out by TC 1-69: color Rendering of White Light Sources.
- Barnes, Bentley T. (December 1957), "Band Systems for Appraisal of Color Rendition", JOSA, 47 (12): 1124–1129, Bibcode:1957JOSA...47.1124B, doi:10.1364/JOSA.47.001124
- Bodrogi, Peter (2004), "Colour rendering: past, present(2004), and future", CIE Expert Symposium on LED Light Sources (PDF), pp. 10–12, archived from the original (PDF) on 2011-07-21
- Crawford, Brian Hewson (December 1959), "Measurement of color rendering tolerances", JOSA, 49 (12): 1147–1156, Bibcode:1959JOSA...49.1147C, doi:10.1364/JOSA.49.001147
- Davis, Wendy; Ohno, Yoshi (December 2006), Color Rendering of Light Sources, NIST, archived from the original on 2009-08-25
- Hung, Po-Chieh (September 2002), "Sensitivity metamerism index digital still camera", in Dazun Zhao; Ming R. Luo; Kiyoharu Aizawa (eds.), Proceedings of the SPIE: Color Science and Imaging Technologies, vol. 4922, pp. 1–14, Bibcode:2002SPIE.4922....1H, doi:10.1117/12.483116
- Nickerson, Dorothy (January 1960), "Light sources and color rendering", JOSA, 50 (1): 57–69, Bibcode:1960JOSA...50...57N, doi:10.1364/JOSA.50.000057
- Ohno, Yoshi (2006). "Optical metrology for LEDs and solid state lighting". In E. Rosas; R. Cardoso; J.C. Bermudez; O. Barbosa-Garcia (eds.). Proceedings of SPIE: Fifth Symposium Optics in Industry. Fifth Symposium Optics in Industry. Vol. 6046. pp. 604625-1 – 604625-8. Bibcode:2006SPIE.6046E..25O. doi:10.1117/12.674617.
- Pousset, Nicolas; Obein, Gael; Razet, Annick (2010), "Visual experiment on LED lighting quality with color quality scale colored samples" (PDF), Proceedings of CIE 2010: Lighting Quality and Energy Efficiency, Vienna, Austria: 722–729
- Schanda, János (April 2–5, 2002). The Concept of Colour Rendering Revisited (PDF). First European Conference on Color in Graphics Imaging and Vision. Poitiers, France. Archived from the original (PDF) on 2011-07-21.
- Schanda, János; Sándor, Norbert (2003). Colour rendering, past – present – future. International Lighting and Colour Conference, Cape Town, South Africa, Nov 2–5, 2003. pp. 76–85.
- Thornton, William A. (1972), "Color-Rendering Capability of Commercial Lamps", Applied Optics, 11 (5): 1078–1086, Bibcode:1972ApOpt..11.1078T, doi:10.1364/AO.11.001078, PMID 20119099
- Smet, K.A.G. (2011), "Correlation between color quality metric predictions and visual appreciation of light sources", Optics Express, 19 (9): 8151–8166, Bibcode:2011OExpr..19.8151S, doi:10.1364/oe.19.008151, PMID 21643065
- Dangol, R.; Islam, M.; Hyvärinen, M.; Bhusal, P.; Puolakka, M.; Halonen, L. (December 2013), "Subjective preferences and colour quality metrics of LED light sources", Lighting Research and Technology, 45 (6): 666–688, doi:10.1177/1477153512471520, ISSN 1477-1535
- Islam, M.S.; Dangol, R.; Hyvärinen, M.; Bhusal, P.; Puolakka, M.; Halonen, L. (December 2013), "User preferences for LED lighting in terms of light spectrum", Lighting Research and Technology, 45 (6): 641–665, doi:10.1177/1477153513475913, ISSN 1477-1535
- Baniya, R.R.; Dangol, R.; Bhusal, P.; Wilm, A.; Baur, E.; Puolakka, M.; Halonen, L. (2015). "User-acceptance studies for simplified light-emitting diode spectra". Lighting Research and Technology. 47 (2): 177–191. doi:10.1177/1477153513515264.
- Dangol, R.; Islam, M.; Hyvärinen, M.; Bhusal, P.; Puolakka, M.; Halonen, L. (2015). "User acceptance studies for LED office lighting: Preference, naturalness and colourfulness". Lighting Research and Technology. 47 (1): 36–53. doi:10.1177/1477153513514424.
- Islam, M.; Dangol, R.; Hyvärinen, M.; Bhusal, P.; Puolakka, M.; Halonen, L. (2013). "User acceptance studies for LED office lighting: lamp spectrum, spatial brightness and illuminance level". Lighting Research and Technology. 47 (1): 54–79. doi:10.1177/1477153513514425.
