= High-CRI LED lighting =

LED lighting source

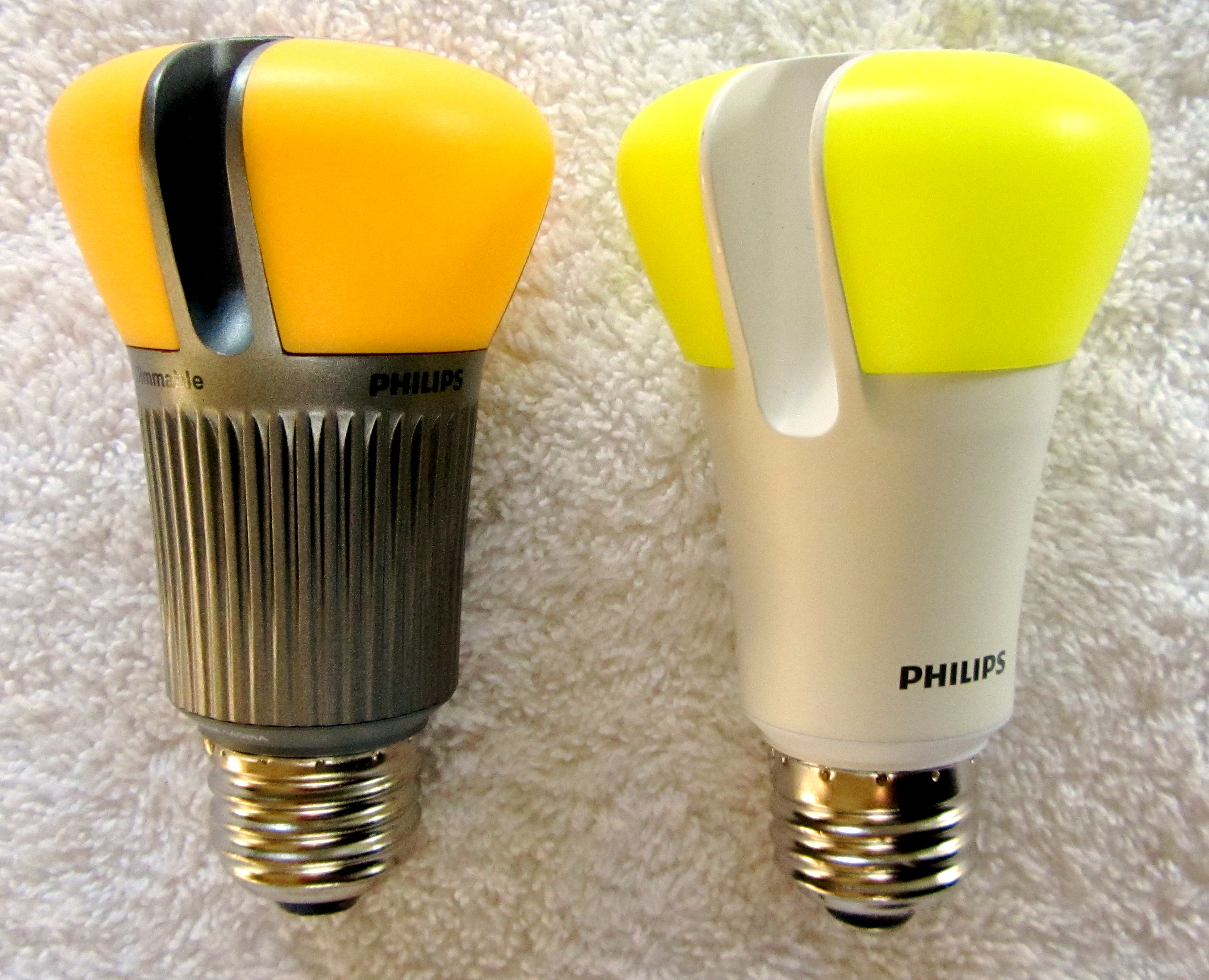
The left LED lamp has a CRI of 80, while the right one has 92. An incandescent light bulb has a CRI of 100.

High-CRI LED lighting is a light-emitting diode (LED) lighting source that offers a high color rendering index (CRI).

CRI is a quantitative measure of a light's ability to reproduce the colors of objects faithfully in comparison with an ideal or natural light source. In general terms, CRI is a measure of a light source's ability to show object colors "realistically" or "naturally" compared to a familiar reference source, either incandescent light or sunlight.

Efficiently achieving an acceptable CRI has been the most difficult metric for more modern light bulbs attempting to replace older incandescent bulbs. It is therefore frequently ignored in marketing (the CRI value only occasionally appears on product packaging). Light bulbs with a high CRI can be acceptable replacements for incandescent bulbs. Most LED lamps do not have a CRI above 90. For example, the top bulbs listed in the 2016 Consumer Review have a CRI of 80.

In 2008, the U.S. Department of Energy created the L Prize to find an incandescent light bulb replacement that met efficiency metrics and had a CRI above 90. On August 3, 2011, Philips was declared as the first winner of the L Prize.

== Calculation ==
CRI is calculated from the differences in the chromaticities of eight CIE standard color samples (CIE 1995) when illuminated by a light source and by a reference illuminant of the same correlated color temperature (CCT), commonly measured in kelvins, indicating the light color produced by a radiating black body at a certain temperature; the smaller the average difference in chromaticities, the higher the CRI. A CRI of 100 represents the maximum possible value. Lower CRI values indicate that some colors appear unnatural. Incandescent lamps have a CRI above 95. Cool white fluorescent lamps have a CRI of 62, fluorescent lamps containing rare-earth phosphors are available with CRI values of 80 and above.

For CCTs less than 5000 K, the reference illuminants used in the CRI calculation procedure are the spectral power distributions (SPDs) of blackbody radiators; for CCTs above 5000 K, imaginary SPDs calculated from a mathematical model of sunlight are used. These reference sources were selected to approximate incandescent lamps and sunlight, respectively.

The CRI measure in use in 2017 was developed by the CIE in 1974 and slightly updated in 1995. The measure has two main flaws. Its color differences are measured in a non-uniform color space. Its color sample set has just 8 items, which is too few to test lights with complex spectra. A light manufacturer can tune its SPD to the sample set to achieve an artificially high CRI. In 2015, the Illuminating Engineering Society (IES) produced a replacement to the CRI measure that uses a newer color space and 99 color samples. In 2017, the CIE published an almost identical measure, but it did not deprecate its 1995 CRI measure.

=== CRI, Ra and Re ===
Color Rendering Index (CRI) is determined by the distinctions in the chromaticities of fifteen test color samples (TCS), where objects are illuminated by the light source to be evaluated and a reference illuminant with the same CCT. The higher the CRI value, the smaller the differences between indices will be. A CRI value of 100 indicates optimal performance for a light source, while a low CRI value may cause some colors to appear unnatural. The most commonly used CRI value is called Ra, which is the average of the first eight indices (R1-R8). Less well known but more accurate is the extended CRI (Re), which averages R1-R15 and thus provides a more accurate measure of color fidelity by accounting for the rendering of more colors.

Extended CRI is the average of the R1-R15 indices. In particular, it accounts for certain saturated colors, such as deep red and deep blue, that the general CRI (Ra) does not consider. Therefore, it is important to check certain Ri numbers in the extended CRI, such as R9 and R12, which represent two significant colors for film/video and medical lighting. Thus, when talking about the color rendering index, the definition of high CRI varies, and it is better to begin comparisons with the general CRI (Ra) but emphasize specific Ri numbers in Extended CRI (Re).

== Criticism ==
CRI has been challenged because fidelity to reference illuminants such as CCT is not all that measures the quality of illumination. Various CCTs are preferred, and scoring 100 at one CCT does not imply equal illumination quality as scoring 100 at another CCT. The "warmer" light colors, such as a 2700 K incandescent bulb or a 1700 K candlelight, are more easily reproduced than more neutral white lights, such as 4800 K direct sunlight, and thus usually have higher CRI ratings in alternative light sources such as CFL and LED bulbs; "warmer" light (redder) naturally renders colors less accurately. Think of how the world looks at sunset (2000 K) compared to high noon (5600 K).

Problems have been encountered attempting to use LED lighting on film and video sets. The color spectra of LED lighting's primary colors do not match the expected color-wavelength bandpasses of film emulsions and digital sensors. As a result, color rendition can be unpredictable in optical prints or in transfers of film and video camera recordings to digital media. This phenomenon with respect to motion picture film has been documented in a series of LED lighting evaluation tests produced by the Academy of Motion Picture Arts and Sciences scientific staff.

== See also ==
- Color temperature
