= Snow globe =

Decorative water filled small glass sphere enclosing a miniaturized scene

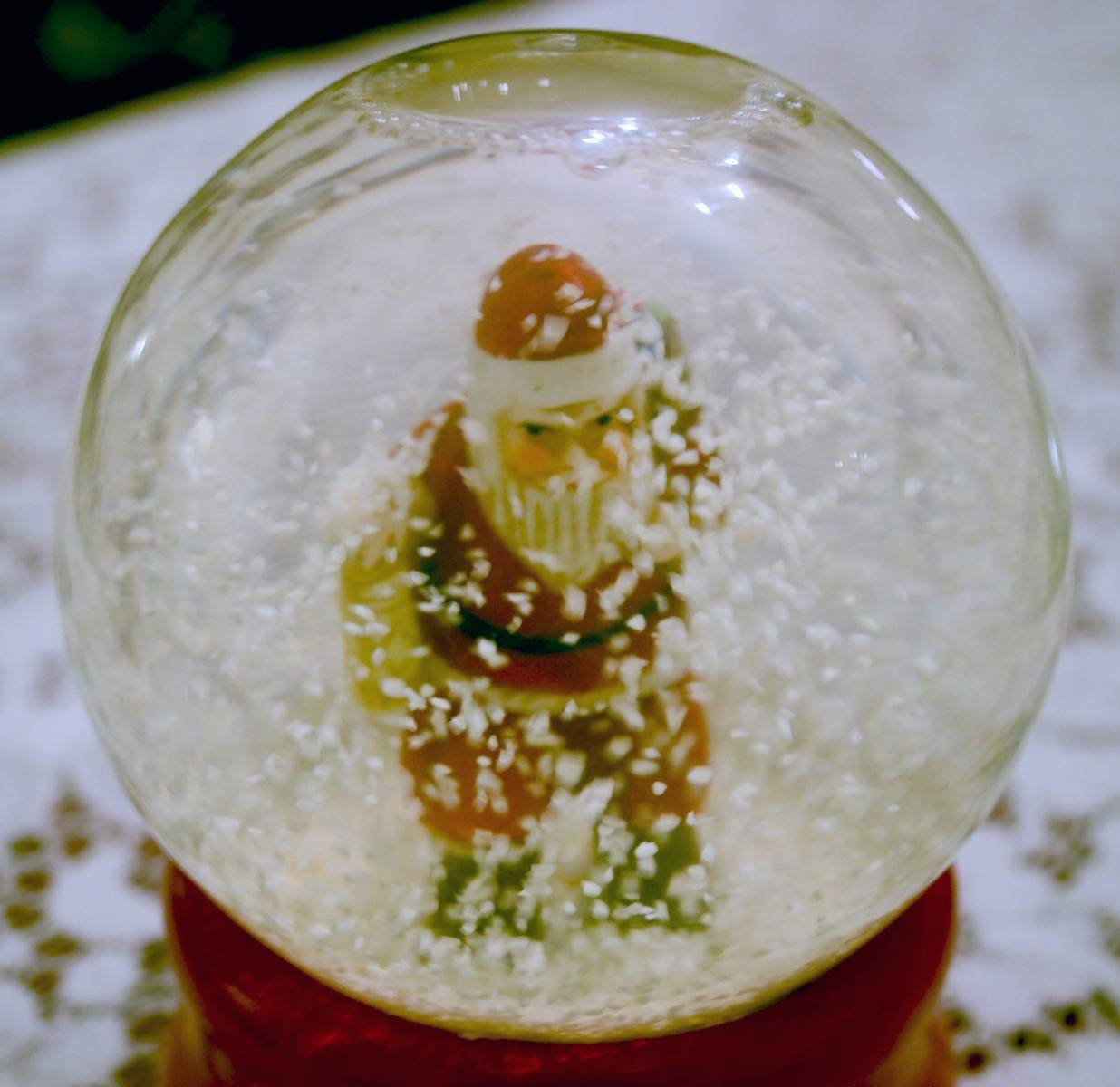
A snow globe with a figurine of Santa Claus

Video of a snow globe. Motive: Vienna

A snow globe (also called a waterglobe, snowstorm, or snowdome) is a transparent sphere or spheroid, traditionally made of glass, enclosing a miniaturized scene of some sort, often together with a model of a town, neighborhood, landscape or figure. The sphere also encloses the water in the globe; the water serves as the medium through which the "snow" falls. To activate the snow, the globe is shaken to churn up the white particles. The globe is then placed back in its position and the flakes fall down slowly through the water. Snow globes sometimes have a built-in music box that plays a song. Some snow globes have a design around the outer base for decoration. Snow globes are often used as a collectible item.

== History ==
The snow globe dates back to at least 1878, as seen in the Paris Exposition Universelle and reported in the US commissioner's report of the expo: "Paper weights of hollow balls filled with water, containing a man with an umbrella. These balls also contain a white powder which, when the paper weight is turned upside down, falls in imitation of a snow storm."

At the end of the 19th century the Austrian Erwin Perzy, a producer of surgical instruments, popularised the so-called Schneekugel (snow globe) and got the first patent for it. Originally his goal was to develop an extra bright lightsource for use as a surgical lamp. As he tried to intensify the candlepower of a so-called Schusterkugel (a water-filled flask used to focus light since the Middle Ages) with particles made out of different materials for reflection purpose, the effect reminded him of snowfall. He then built his first scene globe with a model of the basilica of Mariazell. Because of the great demand for his snow globes, Perzy and his brother Ludwig opened a shop in Vienna, where the production continues until today as a family business exporting throughout the world. The material and methods used to make the particles for Perzy globes are a family production secret.

In the United States, the first snow globe-related patent was filed in 1927 and granted in 1929 to Joseph Garaja of Pittsburgh, Pennsylvania. In 1929, Garaja convinced Novelty Pool Ornaments to manufacture a fish version underwater. During the 1940s, snow globes in the United States were often used for advertising. In Europe, during the 1940s and 1950s, religious snow globes were common gifts for Roman Catholic children. Snow globes have appeared in a number of film scenes, the most famous of which is the opening of the 1941 film Citizen Kane.

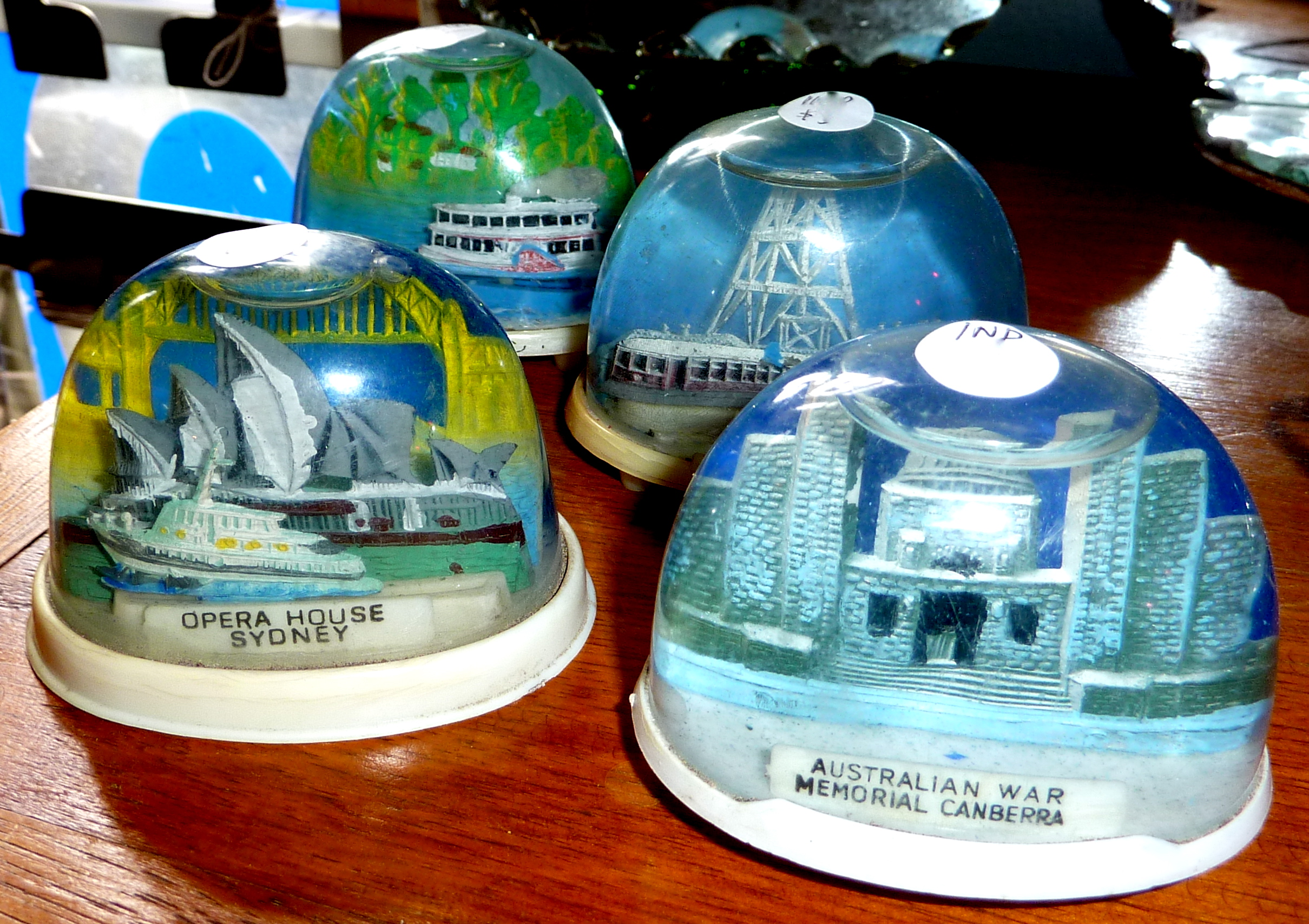
Plastic Australian souvenir snow globes

In the 1950s, the globes, which were previously made of glass, became available in plastic. Currently, there are many different types of snow globes available. These globes are produced by a number of countries and range from the mass-produced versions of Hong Kong and China to the finely crafted types still produced in Austria. Snow globes feature diverse scenes, ranging from the typical holiday souvenirs to more eclectic collectibles featuring Christmas scenes, Disney characters, popular icons, animals, military figures, historical scenes, etc.

Since 2000 fashion and luxury brands, such as Louis Vuitton, Ladurée, Sonia Rykiel, or Martin Margiela, got hold of the trend and grew fond of snow globes as collectible totems and emblems of their brand image. Such enthusiasm was reinforced by presence in numerous art collections of contemporary artists Walter Martin & Paloma Muñoz (also known as Martin & Muñoz) who use snow globes as a medium, or museums who paid tribute to famous artists such as French sculptor Auguste Rodin in creating high quality numbered glass dome snow globes.

== Contents ==
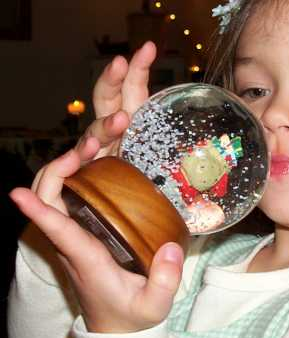
A girl holding a snow globe

Initially snow globes consisted of a heavy lead glass dome which was placed over a ceramic figure or tableau on a black cast ceramic base, filled with water and then sealed. The snow or "flitter" was created by use of bone chips or pieces of porcelain, sand or even sawdust. As they became more sophisticated, the glass became thinner, the bases were lighter (Bakelite was popular during the Art Deco period) and the snow was made out of particles of gold foil or non-soluble soap flakes. For health and safety reasons, white plastic has become more common in the construction of modern snow globes. The liquid has evolved from initially light oil to a mixture of water, antifreeze (ethylene glycol), and glycerol. An added benefit was that glycerol slowed the descent of the snow.

== Embellishments ==
Today's snow globes can include music boxes, moving parts, internal lights, and even electric motors that make the "snow" move so that it is no longer necessary to shake the globe. Some also have central slots for positioning items such as photographs.

== Cultural references ==
In modern culture, snow globes often symbolize childhood, innocence, or so-called "happy days".

The film Citizen Kane (1941) starts with Charles Foster Kane in a bed holding a snow globe, uttering, "Rosebud ..."; the globe slips from his dying hand and smashes. The film historian Paul Malcolm noted the scattered content of the snow globe parallels the scattered or "dispersed" story of Kane to come in the film. In Erica Rand's The Ellis Island Snow Globe (2005), a snow globe from the Ellis Island gift shop is one of the objects that "demonstrate how some narratives are promoted while others are repressed to represent a particular version of United States history and citizenship." Additionally, the series finale of St. Elsewhere famously ends with the implication that the events of the whole series were nothing more than a mere fantasy imagined by Tommy Westphall, an autistic boy whose most treasured possession is a snow globe containing a small model of a building resembling the hospital in which the series is set.

== See also ==
- Glass paperweight
