= CQS =

CQS may refer to:

- Command-query separation
- Consolidated Quotation System
- Color Quality Scale
- CQS (Asset Manager), managed by Michael Hintze
