= Color discrimination =

Color discrimination can refer to:

- Discrimination based on skin tone
- Discrimination between colors in color vision (see also Metamerism (color))
