= Ceramic metal-halide lamp =

Type of lamp

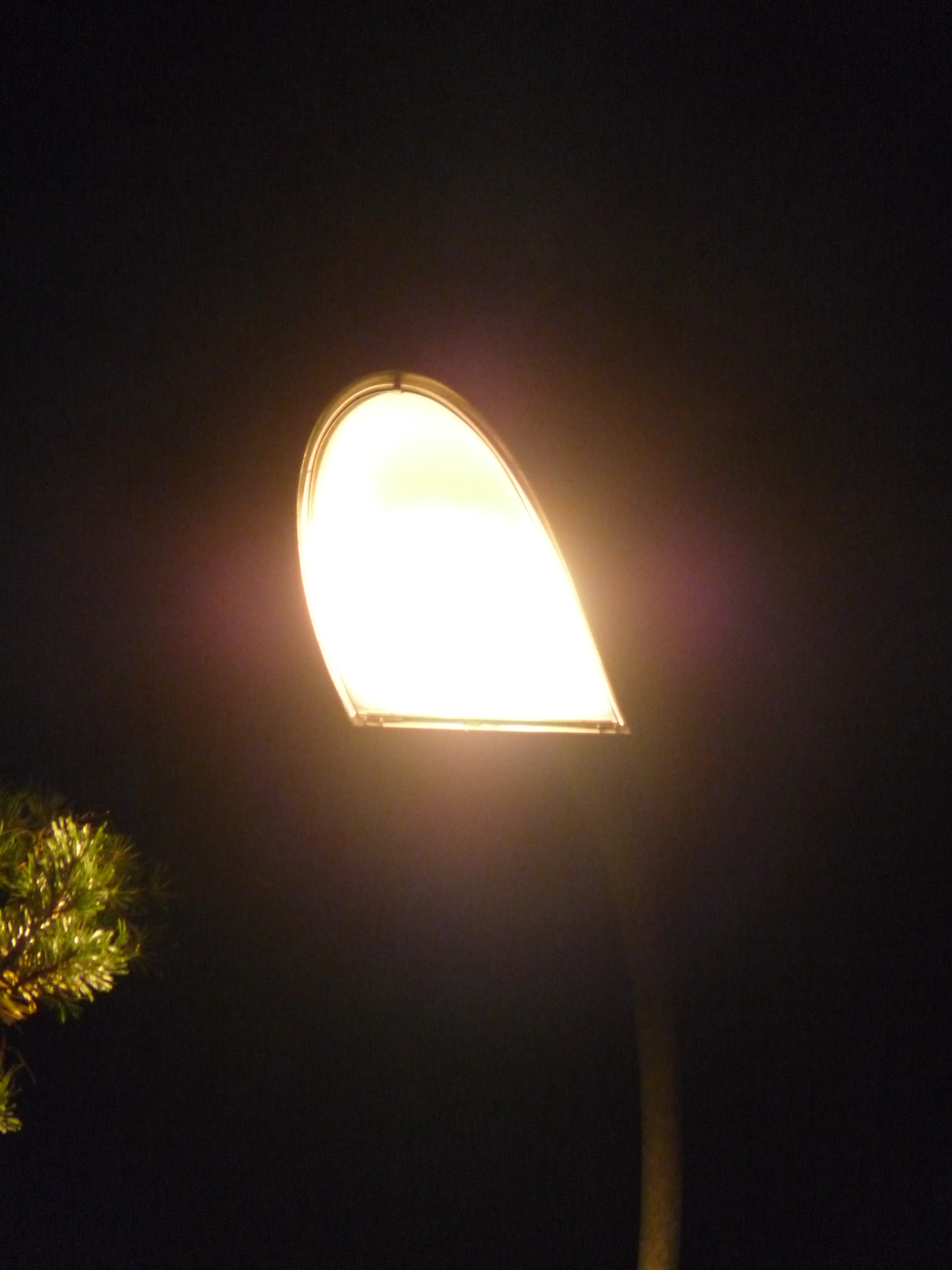
Streetlamp with a ceramic metal halide bulb

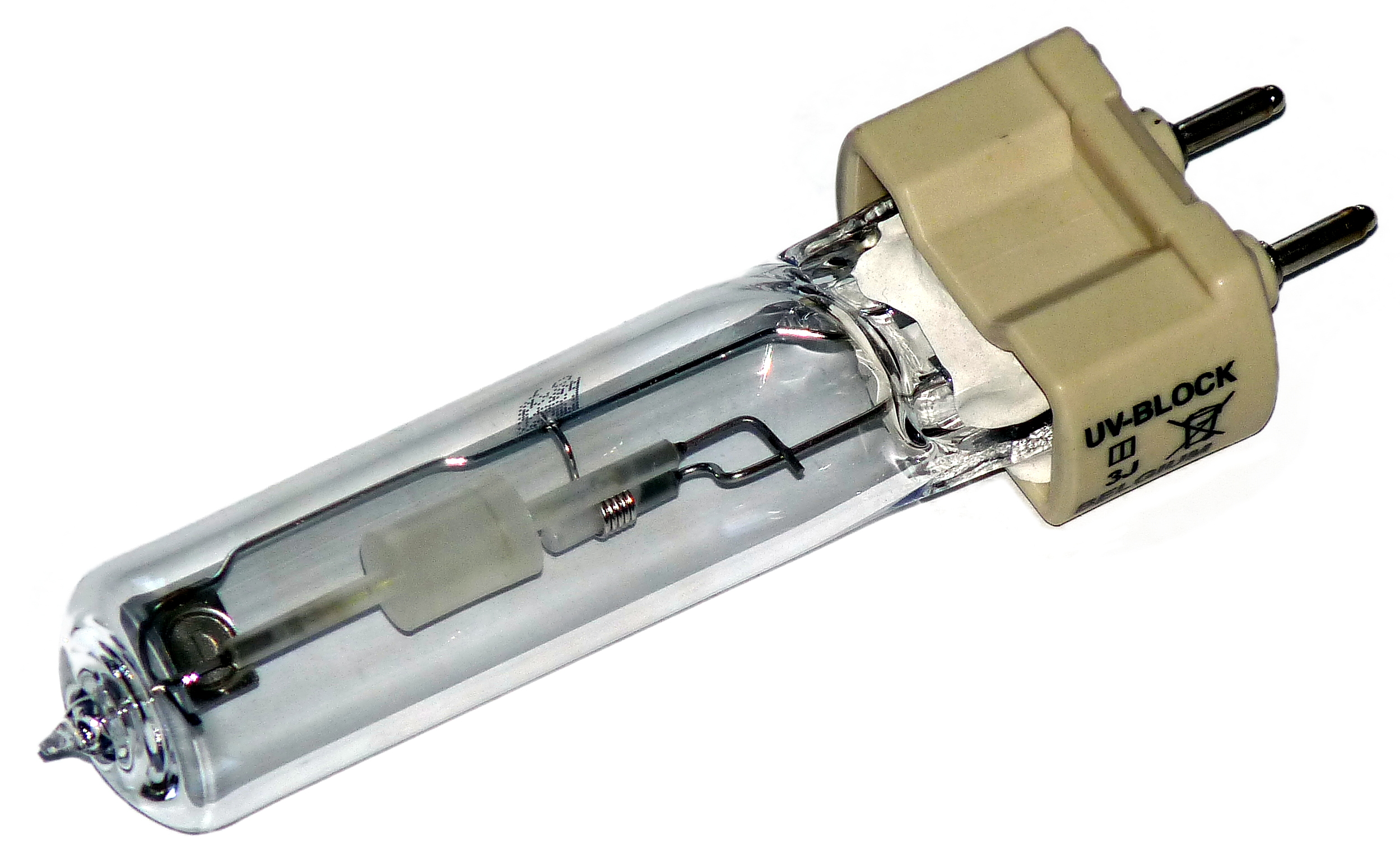
Ceramic metal halide bulb with G12 socket

A ceramic metal-halide lamp (CMH), also generically known as a ceramic discharge metal-halide (CDM) lamp, is a type of metal-halide lamp that is 10–20% more efficient than the traditional quartz metal halide and produces a superior color rendition (80-96 CRI).

Applications for these lamps include shop lighting, street lighting, architectural lighting and agricultural lighting including grow lights. A CMH light was first exhibited by the Thorn Lighting Group in 1981 at the Hannover World Light Fair, and the first commercial ceramic metal halide lamps were distributed by Philips in 1994.

The term "Light Emitting Ceramic" (LEC) is sometimes generically used to describe ceramic metal-halide lamps in grow lights in general, though that term is actually the registered trademark of a specific brand of ceramic metal halide light.

== Operation ==
The ceramic metal halide is a variation of the metal-halide lamp which is itself a variation of the old (high-pressure) mercury-vapor lamp. A CMH uses a ceramic arc tube instead of the fused quartz arc tube of a traditional metal halide lamp. Ceramic arc tubes allow higher arc tube temperatures, which some manufacturers claim results in better efficacy, color rendering, and color stability.

The discharge is contained in a ceramic tube, usually made of sintered alumina, similar to that used in the high pressure sodium lamp. During operation, the temperature of this ceramic tube can exceed 1200 kelvins. The ceramic tube is filled with mercury, argon and metal-halide salts (for example, sodium iodide). Because of the high wall temperature, the metal halide salts are partly vaporized. Inside the hot plasma, these salts are dissociated into metallic atoms and iodine.

The metallic atoms are the main source of light in these lamps, creating a white light with a CRI (color rendering index) of up to 96. The exact correlated color temperature and CRI depend on the specific mixture of metal halide salts. There are also warm-white ceramic metal halide lamps, with somewhat lower CRI (78-82) which still give a more clear and natural-looking light than the old mercury-vapour and sodium-vapour lamps when used as street lights, besides being more economical to use.

The ceramic tube is an advantage in comparison to earlier fused quartz. During operation, at high temperature and radiant flux, metal ions tend to penetrate the silica, depleting the inside of the tube. Alumina is not prone to this effect.

CMH lights have a long life of up to 24,000 hours.

== Efficacy ==
Ceramic metal halide lamps use one fifth of the power of comparable tungsten incandescent light bulbs for the same light output (80–117 lm/W) and retain color stability better than most other gas discharge lamps. Like other high-intensity discharge lamps, they require a correctly rated electrical ballast in order to operate.

== See also ==
- List of light sources
