= Color quality scale =

Color rendering score

Color quality scale (CQS) is a color rendering score – a quantitative measure of the ability of a light source to reproduce colors of illuminated objects. Developed by researchers at NIST the metric aims to overcome some of the issues inherent in the widely used color rendering index (CIE Ra, 1974).

- The color space used in CIE R_{a} (CRI) is outdated and nonuniform, and CQS uses CIELAB as a replacement.
- The Von Kries chromatic adaptation transform used by R_{a} does not perform as well as other available models. CQS uses CMCCAT2000.
- CIE R_{a} is based on desaturated samples, and a lamp's performance in rendering these samples faithfully is not necessarily linked to how it may perform with samples of higher saturation. CQS uses higher saturation samples.
- 'Pure' fidelity (where all deviations are considered bad) does not account for desired chromaticity changes. Increased saturation might be preferred. CQS does not penalise against increases in saturation.
- In CIE R_{a} the arithmetic mean is taken of the color differences for the individual samples. In CQS the individual results are combined through a root mean square instead, so that a small number of poorly rendered objects reflects with greater strength in the overall result.
- Negative values of CQS are made impossible due to their potential for consumer confusion.
- CCTs of lower than 2800K are penalised so that the CQS is more representative of their actual color rendering as opposed to their fidelity.

The CQS generates the general index Q_{a}. Several manufacturers are beginning to publish data on CQS scores of their products, including some who claim light sources with CQS scores up to 97.

== See also ==
- Color rendering index
