= Surgical lighting =

Surgical lamp

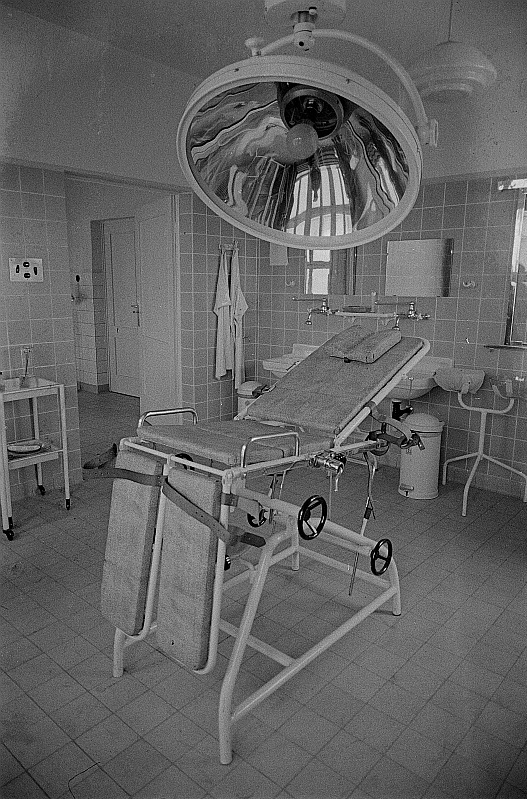
A scialytic lamp from the 50's

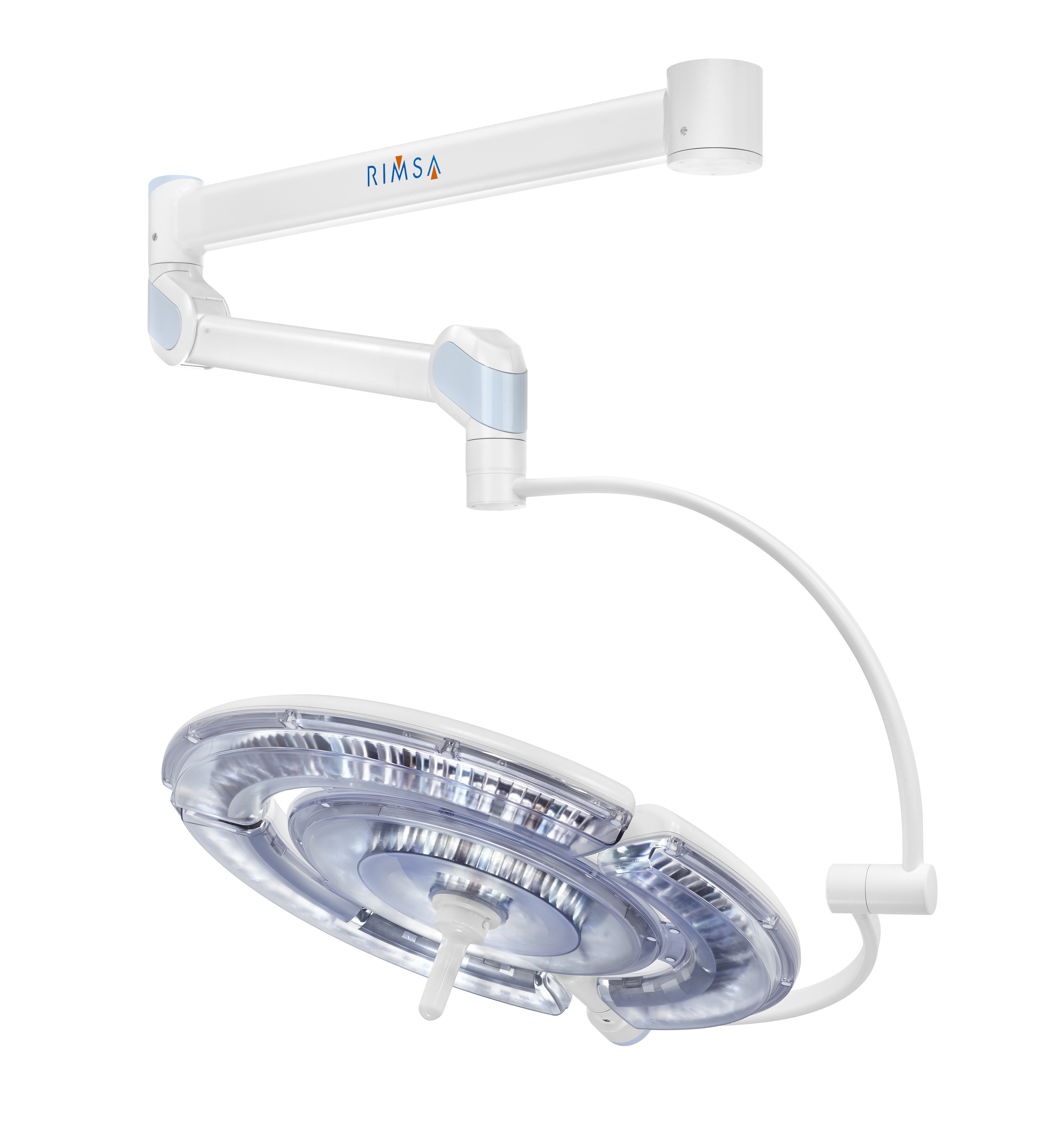
A modern surgical light.Operating room lights are meant to suppress any shadow so that the surgeons have a deep light to use while doing procedures.

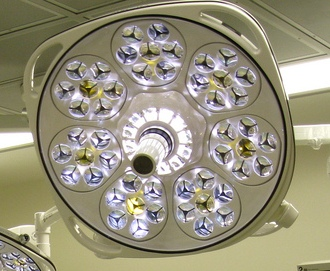
A lamp in an operating room

A surgical light – also referred to as an operating light or surgical lighthead – is a medical device intended to assist medical personnel during a surgical procedure by illuminating a local area or cavity of the patient. A combination of several surgical lights is often referred to as a “surgical light system”.

== History ==
=== Technical development ===
In the mid-1850s, operating rooms were built towards the southeast with windows in the ceiling to benefit from natural sunlight as much as possible. The biggest problem was the dependence of lighting and whether a surgical procedure could be done on the time of day and weather conditions. Furthermore, a doctor, nurse or medical equipment easily blocked the light. The use of mirrors on the four corners of the ceiling to reflect sunlight towards the operating table only slightly alleviated these problems. Attempts were made to use an optical condenser in an indirect light to reduce the heating, but without success. The entrance of electric lights into the operating room in the 1880s was accompanied by problems. With early electrical technology control of the light emitted was poor. Electric light was still moving and diffuse, with great heat radiation.

Many operating room lights used halogen lamps or xenon lamps, some with backup lamps that operated in case of lamp failure until the advent of Light-emitting diodes as light sources since 2007 which remove the problem of heat radiation and reduce energy requirements. Early LED surgical lamps suffered from color shadows since several LEDs with distinct colors and their own reflectors were used but modern LED surgical lamps do not have this problem. Surgical lights can have cameras that are pointed at the surgical field, and many surgical lights can be used with disposable handles.

== Terminology and measurements ==
Lux
Unit for the amount of visible light measured by a luxmeter at a certain point.

Central illuminance (Ec)
Illuminance (measured in lux) at 1m distance from the light emitting surface in the light field centre.

Light field centre
Point in the light field (lighted area) where illuminance reaches maximum lux intensity. It is the reference point for most measurements.

Depth of illumination
The distance between the points of 20% illumination intensity above and below the center point. From the point of maximum illumination, which is the center of the light field 1 meter from the light-emitting surface, the photometer is moved toward the light until the light intensity measured falls to 20% of the maximum value. The distance between the center and this point is defined as L1. The similarly measured distance in the direction away from the light is L2. The depth of illumination without needing to refocus is the sum of the two distances L1 and L2. In the second edition of the IEC standard, published in 2009, the threshold value was revised from 20% to 60%.

Shadow dilution
The light's ability to minimize the effect of obstructions.

Light field diameter (D10)
Diameter of light field around the light field centre, ending where the illuminance reaches 10% of Ec. The value reported is the average of four different cross sections through the light field centre.

D50
Diameter of light field around the light field centre, ending where the illuminance reaches 50% of Ec. The value reported is the average of four different cross sections through the light field centre

== Norms and requirements for surgical light ==
The International Electrotechnical Commission (IEC) created the document IEC 60601-2-41 – Particular requirements for the basic safety and essential performance of surgical luminaires and luminaires for diagnosis, 2009 to establish norms and guidelines for the characteristics of a surgical and examination light to secure safety for the patient as well as lower the risk to a reasonable level when the light is used according to the user manual. Some of the standards for surgical lightheads are the following:

- Homogeneous light: The light should offer good illumination on a flat, narrow or deep surface in a cavity, despite obstacles such as surgeons' heads or hands.
- Lux: The central illuminance should be between 160,000 and 40,000 lux.
- Light field diameter: The D50 diameter should be at least 50% of D10.
- Colour rendition: For the purpose of distinguishing true tissue colour in a cavity, the colour rendering index (Ra) should be between 85 and 100.
- Backup possibility: In case of interruption of the power supply, the light should be restored within 5 seconds with at least 50% of the previous lux intensity, but not less than 40,000 lux. Within 40 seconds the light should be completely restored to the original brightness.
- Announcement: The IEC document also mentions what needs to be notified to the user. For example, the voltage and power consumption should be marked on or near the lampholder as well as on the lighthead. In the instructions for use the following should be announced.
  - Cleaning and decontamination of the surgical light
  - Safety aspects of the optical filter (purpose and warning to prevent removal)
  - Central illuminance
  - Light field diameter
  - Depth of illumination
  - Shadow dilution
  - Correlated colour temperature and colour rendering index
  - Total irradiance
  - Cleaning and disinfecting
  - Handling of the lighthead in case of failure
  - How the user should respect the national rules for hygiene and disinfecting
