= Color =

Perception caused by wavelengths of light

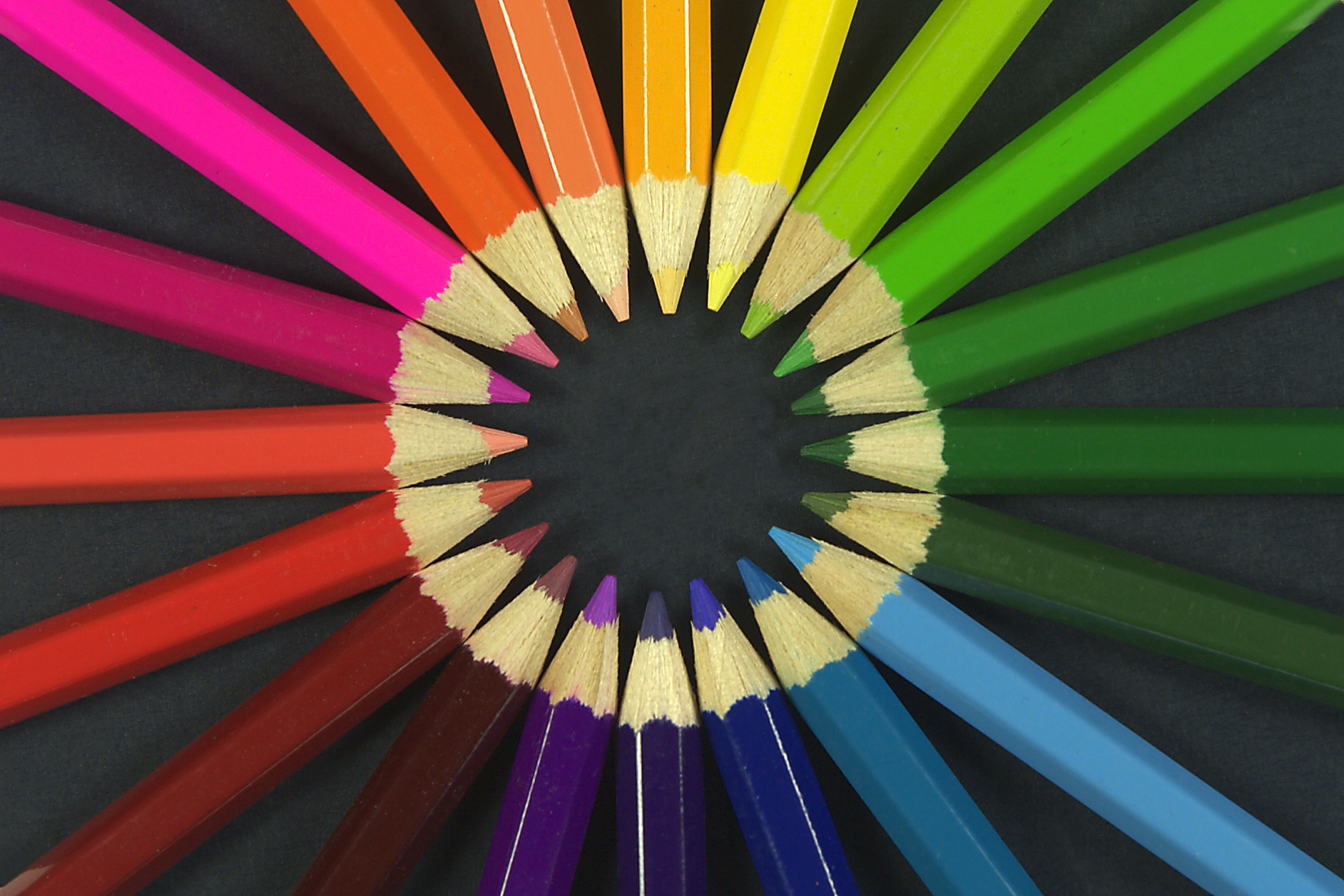
Colored pencils

Color (or colour in Commonwealth English) is the visual perception produced by the activation of the different types of cone cells in the eye caused by light. Though color is not an inherent property of matter, color perception is related to an object's light absorption, emission, reflection and transmission. For most humans, visible wavelengths of light are the ones perceived in the visible light spectrum, with three types of cone cells (trichromacy). Other animals may have a different number of cone cell types or have eyes sensitive to different wavelengths, such as bees that can distinguish ultraviolet, and thus have a different color sensitivity range. Animal perception of color originates from different light wavelength or spectral sensitivity in cone cell types, which is then processed by the brain.

Colors have perceived properties such as hue, colorfulness, and lightness. Colors can also be additively mixed (mixing light) or subtractively mixed (mixing pigments). If one color is mixed in the right proportions, because of metamerism, they may look the same as another stimulus with a different reflection or emission spectrum. For convenience, colors can be organized in a color space, which when being abstracted as a mathematical color model can assign each region of color with a corresponding set of numbers. Thus, color spaces are an essential tool for color reproduction in print, photography, computer monitors, and television. Some of the most well-known color models and color spaces are RGB, CMYK, HSL/HSV, CIE Lab, and YCbCr/YUV.

Because the perception of color is an important aspect of human life, different colors have been associated with emotions, activity, and nationality. Names of color regions in different cultures can have different, sometimes overlapping areas. In visual arts, color theory is used to govern the use of colors in an aesthetically pleasing and harmonious way. The theory of color includes the color complements; color balance; and classification of primary colors, secondary colors, and tertiary colors. The study of colors in general is called color science.

== Physical properties ==
The visible spectrum perceived from 390 to 710 nm wavelength

Electromagnetic radiation is characterized by its wavelength (or frequency) and its intensity. When the wavelength is within the visible spectrum (the range of wavelengths humans can perceive, approximately from 390 nm to 700 nm), it is known as "visible light".

Most light sources emit light at many different wavelengths; a source's spectrum is a distribution giving its intensity at each wavelength. Although the spectrum of light arriving at the eye from a given direction determines the color sensation in that direction, there are many more possible spectral combinations than color sensations. In fact, one may formally define a color as a class of spectra that give rise to the same color sensation, although such classes would vary widely among different animal species, and to a lesser extent among individuals within the same species. In each such class, the members are called metamers of the color in question. This effect can be visualized by comparing the light sources' spectral power distributions and the resulting colors.

=== Spectral colors ===
The familiar colors of the rainbow in the spectrum—named using the Latin word for appearance or apparition by Isaac Newton in 1671—include all those colors that can be produced by visible light of a single wavelength only, the pure spectral or monochromatic colors. The spectrum above shows approximate wavelengths (in nm) for spectral colors in the visible range. Spectral colors have 100% purity, and are fully saturated. A complex mixture of spectral colors can be used to describe any color, which is the definition of a light power spectrum.

The spectral colors form a continuous spectrum, and how it is divided into distinct colors linguistically is a matter of culture and historical contingency. Despite the ubiquitous ROYGBIV mnemonic used to remember the spectral colors in English, the inclusion or exclusion of colors is contentious, with disagreement often focused on indigo and cyan. Even if the subset of color terms is agreed, their wavelength ranges and borders between them may not be.

The intensity of a spectral color, relative to the context in which it is viewed, may alter its perception considerably. For example, a low-intensity orange-yellow is brown, and a low-intensity yellow-green is olive green. Additionally, hue shifts towards yellow or blue happen if the intensity of a spectral light is increased; this is called Bezold–Brücke shift. In color models capable of representing spectral colors, such as CIELUV, a spectral color has the maximal saturation. In Helmholtz coordinates, this is described as 100% purity.

=== Color of objects ===
The physical color of an object depends on how it absorbs and scatters light. Most objects scatter light to some degree and do not reflect or transmit light specularly like glasses or mirrors. A transparent object allows almost all light to transmit or pass through, thus transparent objects are perceived as colorless. Conversely, an opaque object does not allow light to transmit through and instead absorbs or reflects the light it receives. Like transparent objects, translucent objects allow light to transmit through, but translucent objects are seen colored because they scatter or absorb certain wavelengths of light via internal scattering. The absorbed light is often dissipated as heat.

== Color vision ==
=== Development of theories of color vision ===
The upper disk and the lower disk have exactly the same objective color, and are in identical gray surroundings; based on context differences, humans perceive the squares as having different reflectances, and may interpret the colors as different color categories; see checker shadow illusion

Although Aristotle and other ancient scientists had already written on the nature of light and color vision, it was not until Isaac Newton that light was identified as the source of the color sensation. In 1810, Johann Wolfgang von Goethe published his comprehensive Theory of Colors in which he provided a rational description of color experience, which "tells us how it originates, not what it is".

In 1801, Thomas Young proposed his trichromatic theory, to explain how a wide spectrum of different wavelengths could be detected by the human eye. It would be unreasonable to suppose that the human eye contained hundreds of different receptors each responding to the presence of a specific wavelength. Instead, he suggested that the human experience of color derives from a complex interaction and mixing from the output of three receptors.

This theory was later confirmed by James Clerk Maxwell and refined by Hermann von Helmholtz. Maxwell experimentally demonstrated that any color could be matched with a combination of three lights. As Helmholtz puts it, "the principles of Newton's law of mixture were experimentally confirmed by Maxwell in 1856. Young's theory of color sensations, like so much else that this marvelous investigator achieved in advance of his time, remained unnoticed until Maxwell directed attention to it."

At the same time as Helmholtz, Ewald Hering developed the opponent process theory of color, noting that color blindness and afterimages typically come in opponent pairs (red-green, blue-orange, yellow-violet, and black-white). Ultimately these two theories were synthesized in 1957 by Hurvich and Jameson, who showed that retinal processing corresponds to the trichromatic theory, while processing at the level of the lateral geniculate nucleus corresponds to the opponent theory.

In 1931, the International Commission on Illumination (CIE), an international group of experts, developed a mathematical color model which mapped out the space of observable colors, allowing every individual color able to be specified with a set of three numbers.

=== Color in the eye ===
Normalized typical human cone cell responses (S, M, and L types) to monochromatic spectral stimuli

The ability of the human eye to distinguish colors is based upon the varying sensitivity of different cells in the retina to light of different wavelengths. Humans are trichromatic—the retina contains three types of color receptor cells, or cones. One type, relatively distinct from the other two, is most responsive to light that is perceived as blue or blue-violet, with wavelengths around 450 nm; cones of this type are sometimes called short-wavelength cones or S cones (or misleadingly, blue cones). The other two types are closely related genetically and chemically: middle-wavelength cones, M cones, or green cones are most sensitive to light perceived as green, with wavelengths around 540 nm, while the long-wavelength cones, L cones, or red cones, are most sensitive to light that is perceived as greenish yellow, with wavelengths around 570 nm.

Light, no matter how complex its composition of wavelengths, is reduced to three color components by the eye. Each cone type adheres to the principle of univariance, which is that each cone's output is determined by the amount of light that falls on it over all wavelengths. For each location in the visual field, the three types of cones yield three signals based on the extent to which each is stimulated. These amounts of stimulation are sometimes called tristimulus values.

The response curve as a function of wavelength varies for each type of cone. Because the curves overlap, some tristimulus values do not occur for any incoming light combination. For example, it is not possible to stimulate only the mid-wavelength (so-called "green") cones; the other cones will inevitably be stimulated to some degree at the same time. The set of all possible tristimulus values determines the human color space. It has been estimated that humans can distinguish roughly 10 million different colors.

The other type of light-sensitive cell in the eye, the rod, has a different response curve. In normal situations, when light is bright enough to strongly stimulate the cones, rods play virtually no role in vision at all. On the other hand, in dim light, the cones are understimulated leaving only the signal from the rods, resulting in a colorless response (furthermore, the rods are barely sensitive to light in the "red" range). At intermediate (mesopic) light levels, both rods and cones are active, and interactions between rod and cone signals can influence color perception. These effects, combined, are summarized also in the Kruithof curve, which describes the change of color perception and pleasingness of light as a function of temperature and intensity.

=== Color in the brain ===
While the mechanisms of color vision at the level of the retina are well-described in terms of tristimulus values, color processing after that point is organized differently. A dominant theory of color vision proposes that color information is transmitted out of the eye by three opponent processes, or opponent channels, each constructed from the raw output of the cones: a red–green channel, a blue–yellow channel, and a black–white "luminance" channel. This theory has been supported by neurobiology, and accounts for the structure of our subjective color experience. Specifically, it explains why humans cannot perceive a "reddish green" or "yellowish blue", and it predicts the color wheel: it is the collection of colors for which at least one of the two color channels measures a value at one of its extremes.

The exact nature of color perception beyond the processing already described, and indeed the status of color as a feature of the perceived world or rather as a feature of our perception of the world—a type of qualia—is a matter of complex and continuing philosophical dispute.

The visual dorsal stream (green) and ventral stream (purple) are shown; the ventral stream is responsible for color perception

From the V1 blobs, color information is sent to cells in the second visual area, V2. The cells in V2 that are most strongly color tuned are clustered in the "thin stripes" that, like the blobs in V1, stain for the enzyme cytochrome oxidase (separating the thin stripes are interstripes and thick stripes, which seem to be concerned with other visual information like motion and high-resolution form). Neurons in V2 then synapse onto cells in the extended V4. This area includes not only V4, but two other areas in the posterior inferior temporal cortex, anterior to area V3, the dorsal posterior inferior temporal cortex, and posterior TEO. Area V4 was initially suggested by Semir Zeki to be exclusively dedicated to color, and he later showed that V4 can be subdivided into subregions with very high concentrations of color cells separated from each other by zones with lower concentration of such cells though even the latter cells respond better to some wavelengths than to others, a finding confirmed by subsequent studies. The presence in V4 of orientation-selective cells led to the view that V4 is involved in processing both color and form associated with color but it is worth noting that the orientation selective cells within V4 are more broadly tuned than their counterparts in V1, V2, and V3. Color processing in the extended V4 occurs in millimeter-sized color modules called globs. This is the part of the brain in which color is first processed into the full range of hues found in color space.

=== Nonstandard color perception ===
==== Color vision deficiency ====
A color vision deficiency causes an individual to perceive a smaller gamut of colors than the standard observer with normal color vision. The effect can be mild, having lower "color resolution" (i.e. anomalous trichromacy), moderate, lacking an entire dimension or channel of color (e.g. dichromacy), or complete, lacking all color perception (i.e. monochromacy). Most forms of color blindness derive from one or more of the three classes of cone cells either being missing, having a shifted spectral sensitivity or having lower responsiveness to incoming light. In addition, cerebral achromatopsia is caused by neural anomalies in those parts of the brain where visual processing takes place.

Some colors that appear distinct to an individual with normal color vision will appear metameric to the color blind. The most common form of color blindness is congenital red–green color blindness, affecting ~8% of males. Individuals with the strongest form of this condition (dichromacy) will experience blue and purple, green and yellow, teal, and gray as colors of confusion, i.e. metamers.

==== Tetrachromacy ====
Outside of humans, which are mostly trichromatic (having three types of cones), most mammals are dichromatic, possessing only two cones. However, outside of mammals, most vertebrates are tetrachromatic, having four types of cones. This includes most birds, reptiles, amphibians, and bony fish. An extra dimension of color vision means these vertebrates can see two distinct colors that a normal human would view as metamers. Some invertebrates, such as the mantis shrimp, have an even higher number of cones (12) that could lead to a richer color gamut than even imaginable by humans.

The existence of human tetrachromats is a contentious notion. As many as half of all human females have 4 distinct cone classes, which could enable tetrachromacy. However, a distinction must be made between retinal (or weak) tetrachromats, which express four cone classes in the retina, and functional (or strong) tetrachromats, which are able to make the enhanced color discriminations expected of tetrachromats. In fact, there is only one peer-reviewed report of a functional tetrachromat. It is estimated that while the average person is able to see one million colors, someone with functional tetrachromacy could see a hundred million colors.

==== Synesthesia ====
In certain forms of synesthesia, perceiving letters and numbers (grapheme–color synesthesia) or hearing sounds (chromesthesia) will evoke a perception of color. Behavioral and functional neuroimaging experiments have demonstrated that these color experiences lead to changes in behavioral tasks and lead to increased activation of brain regions involved in color perception, thus demonstrating their reality, and similarity to real color percepts, albeit evoked through a non-standard route. Synesthesia can occur genetically, with 4% of the population having variants associated with the condition. Synesthesia has also been known to occur with brain damage, drugs, and sensory deprivation.

The philosopher Pythagoras experienced synesthesia and provided one of the first written accounts of the condition in approximately 550 BCE. He created mathematical equations for musical notes that could form part of a scale, such as an octave.

=== Afterimages ===
After exposure to strong light in their sensitivity range, photoreceptors of a given type become desensitized. For a few seconds after the light ceases, they will continue to signal less strongly than they otherwise would. Colors observed during that period will appear to lack the color component detected by the desensitized photoreceptors. This effect is responsible for the phenomenon of afterimages, in which the eye may continue to see a bright figure after looking away from it, but in a complementary color. Afterimage effects have also been used by artists, including Vincent van Gogh.

=== Color constancy ===
When an artist uses a limited color palette, the human visual system tends to compensate by seeing any gray or neutral color as the color which is missing from the color wheel. For example, in a limited palette consisting of red, yellow, black, and white, a mixture of yellow and black will appear as a variety of green, a mixture of red and black will appear as a variety of purple, and pure gray will appear bluish.

The trichromatic theory is strictly true when the visual system is in a fixed state of adaptation. In reality, the visual system is constantly adapting to changes in the environment and compares the various colors in a scene to reduce the effects of the illumination. If a scene is illuminated with one light, and then with another, as long as the difference between the light sources stays within a reasonable range, the colors in the scene appear relatively constant to us. This was studied by Edwin H. Land in the 1970s and led to his retinex theory of color constancy.

Both phenomena are readily explained and mathematically modeled with modern theories of chromatic adaptation and color appearance (e.g. CIECAM02, iCAM). There is no need to dismiss the trichromatic theory of vision, but rather it can be enhanced with an understanding of how the visual system adapts to changes in the viewing environment.

== Reproduction ==
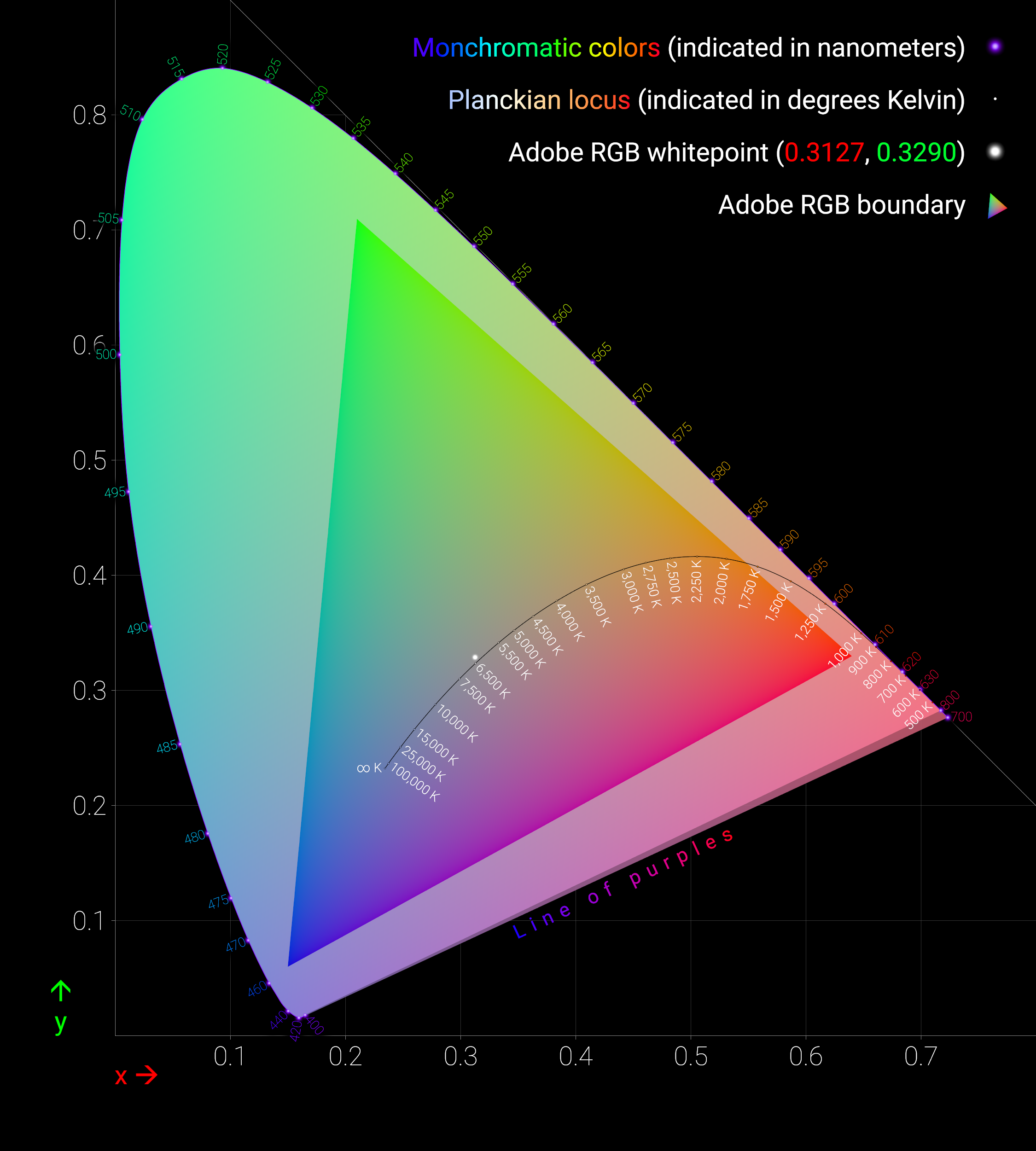
The CIE 1931 color space xy chromaticity diagram with the visual locus plotted using the CIE (2006) physiologically relevant LMS fundamental color matching functions transformed into the CIE 1931 xy color space and converted into Adobe RGB; the triangle shows the gamut of Adobe RGB, the Planckian locus is shown with color temperatures labeled in Kelvins, the outer curved boundary is the spectral (or monochromatic) locus, with wavelengths shown in nanometers, the colors in this file are being specified using Adobe RGB, areas outside the triangle cannot be accurately rendered since they are outside the gamut of Adobe RGB, therefore they have been interpreted, the colors depicted depend on the gamut and color accuracy of your display

Color reproduction is the science of creating colors for the human eye that faithfully represent the desired color. It focuses on how to construct a spectrum of wavelengths that will best evoke a certain color in an observer. Most colors are not spectral colors, meaning they are mixtures of various wavelengths of light. However, these non-spectral colors are often described by their dominant wavelength, which identifies the single wavelength of light that produces a sensation most similar to the non-spectral color. Dominant wavelength is roughly akin to hue.

There are many color perceptions that by definition cannot be pure spectral colors due to desaturation or because they are purples (mixtures of red and violet light, from opposite ends of the spectrum). Some examples of necessarily non-spectral colors are the achromatic colors (black, gray, and white) and colors such as pink, tan, and magenta.

Two different light spectra that have the same effect on the three color receptors in the human eye will be perceived as the same color. They are metamers of that color. This is exemplified by the white light emitted by fluorescent lamps, which typically has a spectrum of a few narrow bands, while daylight has a continuous spectrum. The human eye cannot tell the difference between such light spectra just by looking into the light source, although the color rendering of each light source may affect the color of objects illuminated by these metameric light sources.

Similarly, most human color perceptions can be generated by a mixture of three colors called primaries. This is used to reproduce color scenes in photography, printing, television, and other media. There are a number of methods or color spaces for specifying a color in terms of three particular primary colors. Each method has its advantages and disadvantages depending on the particular application.

No mixture of colors, however, can produce a response truly identical to that of a spectral color, although one can get close, especially for the longer wavelengths, where the CIE 1931 color space chromaticity diagram has a nearly straight edge. For example, mixing green light (530 nm) and blue light (460 nm) produces cyan light that is slightly desaturated, because response of the red color receptor would be greater to the green and blue light in the mixture than it would be to a pure cyan light at 485 nm that has the same intensity as the mixture of blue and green.

Because of this, the colors reproduced are never perfectly saturated spectral colors, and so spectral colors cannot be matched exactly. However, natural scenes rarely contain fully saturated colors, thus such scenes can usually be approximated well by three-primary color reproduction systems. The range of colors that can be reproduced with a given color reproduction system is called the gamut. The CIE chromaticity diagram can be used to describe the gamut. The gamut available in color printing systems is more complicated to analyze because the primaries used generally are not pure themselves.

Another problem with color reproduction systems is connected with the initial measurement of color, or colorimetry. The characteristics of the color sensors in measurement devices (e.g. cameras, scanners) are often very far from the characteristics of the receptors in the human eye.

A color reproduction system "tuned" to a human with normal color vision may give very inaccurate results for other observers, according to color vision deviations to the standard observer.

The different color response of different devices can be problematic if not properly managed. For color information stored and transferred in digital form, color management techniques, such as those based on ICC profiles, can help to avoid distortions of the reproduced colors. Color management does not circumvent the gamut limitations of particular output devices, but can assist in finding good mapping of input colors into the gamut that can be reproduced.

=== Additive coloring ===
Additive color mixing: combining red and green yields yellow; combining all three primary colors together yields white

Additive color is light created by mixing together light of two or more different colors. Red, green, and blue are the additive primary colors normally used in additive color systems such as projectors, televisions, and computer terminals.

=== Subtractive coloring ===
Subtractive color mixing: combining yellow and magenta yields red; combining all three primary colors together yields black

Subtractive coloring uses dyes, inks, pigments, or filters to absorb some wavelengths of light and not others. The color that a surface displays comes from the parts of the visible spectrum that are not absorbed and therefore remain visible. Without pigments or dye, fabric fibers, paint base and paper are usually made of particles that scatter white light (all colors) well in all directions. When a pigment or ink is added, wavelengths are absorbed or "subtracted" from white light, so light of another color reaches the eye.

If the light is not a pure white source (the case of nearly all forms of artificial lighting), the resulting spectrum will appear a slightly different color. Red paint, viewed under blue light, may appear black. Red paint is red because it scatters only the red components of the spectrum. If red paint is illuminated by blue light, it will be absorbed by the red paint, creating the appearance of a black object.

The subtractive model also predicts the color resulting from a mixture of paints, or similar medium such as fabric dye, whether applied in layers or mixed together prior to application. In the case of paint mixed before application, incident light interacts with many different pigment particles at various depths inside the paint layer before emerging.

== Structural color ==
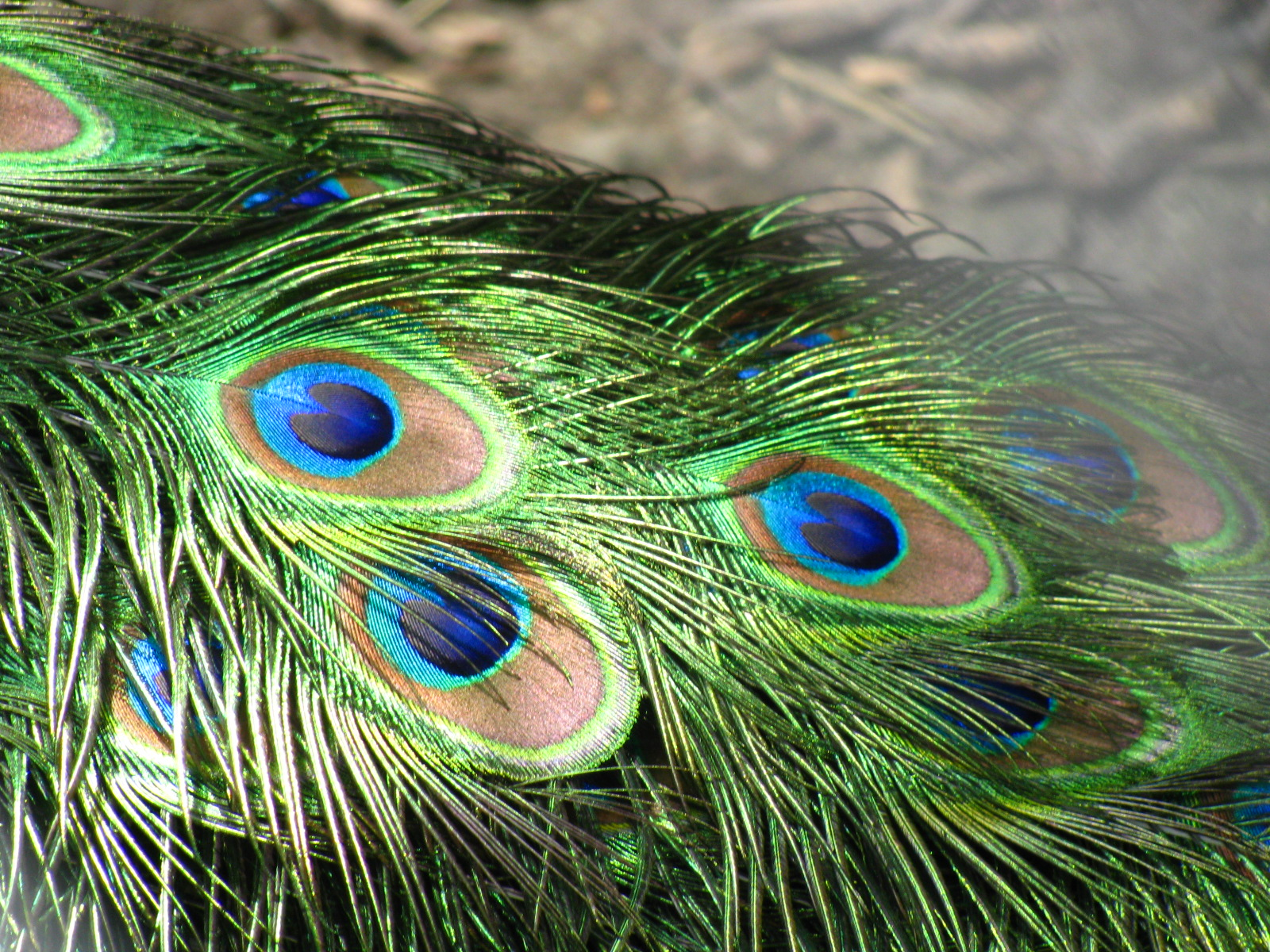
The bright colors of peacock feathers are caused by structural coloration

Structural colors are colors caused by interference effects rather than by pigments. Color effects are produced when a material is scored with fine parallel lines, formed of one or more parallel thin layers, or otherwise composed of microstructures on the scale of the color's wavelength. If the microstructures are spaced randomly, light of shorter wavelengths will be scattered preferentially to produce Tyndall effect colors: the blue of the sky (Rayleigh scattering, caused by structures much smaller than the wavelength of light, in this case, air molecules), the luster of opals, and the blue of human irises. If the microstructures are aligned in arrays, for example, the array of pits in a CD, they behave as a diffraction grating: the grating reflects different wavelengths in different directions due to interference phenomena, separating mixed "white" light into light of different wavelengths. If the structure is one or more thin layers then it will reflect some wavelengths and transmit others, depending on the layers' thickness.

Structural color is studied in the field of thin-film optics. The most ordered or the most changeable structural colors are iridescent. Structural color is responsible for the blues and greens of the feathers of many birds (the blue jay, for example), as well as certain butterfly wings and beetle shells. Variations in the pattern's spacing often give rise to an iridescent effect, as seen in peacock feathers, soap bubbles, films of oil, and mother of pearl, because the reflected color depends upon the viewing angle. Numerous scientists have carried out research in butterfly wings and beetle shells, including Isaac Newton and Robert Hooke. Since 1942, electron micrography has been used, advancing the development of products that exploit structural color, such as "photonic" cosmetics.

== Optimal colors ==
Optimal colors are the most chromatic colors that surfaces can have. That is, optimal colors are the theoretical limit for the color of objects*. For now, we are unable to produce objects with such colors, at least not without recurring to more complex physical phenomena.

*(with classical reflection. Phenomena like fluorescence or structural coloration may cause the color of objects to lie outside the optimal color solid)

The plot of the gamut bounded by optimal colors in a color space is called the optimal color solid or Rösch–MacAdam color solid.

The reflectance spectrum of a color is the amount of light of each wavelength that it reflects, in proportion to a given maximum, which is total reflection of light of that wavelength, and has the value of 1 (100%). If the reflectance spectrum of a color is 0 (0%) or 1 (100%) across the entire visible spectrum, and it has no more than two transitions between 0 and 1, or 1 and 0, then it is an optimal color. With the current state of technology, we are unable to produce any material or pigment with these properties.

Reflectance spectrum of a color-optimal surface. There is no known material with these properties, they are, for what we know, only theoretical.

Thus four types of "optimal color" spectra are possible:

- The transition goes from zero at both ends of the spectrum to one in the middle, as shown in the image at right.
- It goes from one at the ends to zero in the middle.
- It goes from 1 at the start of the visible spectrum to 0 in some point in the middle until its end.
- It goes from 0 at the start of the visible spectrum to 1 at some point in the middle until its end.

The first type produces colors that are similar to the spectral colors and follow roughly the horseshoe-shaped portion of the CIE xy chromaticity diagram (the spectral locus), but are, in surfaces, more chromatic, although less spectrally pure. The second type produces colors that are similar to (but, in surfaces, more chromatic and less spectrally pure than) the colors on the straight line in the CIE xy chromaticity diagram (the line of purples), leading to magenta or purple-like colors. The third type produces the colors located in the "warm" sharp edge of the optimal color solid (this will be explained later in the article). The fourth type produces the colors located in the "cool" sharp edge of the optimal color solid.

In optimal color solids, the colors of the visible spectrum are theoretically black, because their reflectance spectrum is 1 (100%) in only one wavelength, and 0 in all of the other infinite visible wavelengths that there are, meaning that they have a lightness of 0 with respect to white, and will also have 0 chroma, but, of course, 100% of spectral purity. In short: In optimal color solids, spectral colors are equivalent to black (0 lightness, 0 chroma), but have full spectral purity (they are located in the horseshoe-shaped spectral locus of the chromaticity diagram).

In linear color spaces, such as LMS or CIE 1931 XYZ, the set of rays that start at the origin (black, (0, 0, 0)) and pass through all the points that represent the colors of the visible spectrum, and the portion of a plane that passes through the violet half-line and the red half-line (both ends of the visible spectrum), generate the "spectrum cone". The black point (coordinates (0, 0, 0)) of the optimal color solid (and only the black point) is tangent to the "spectrum cone", and the white point ((1, 1, 1)) (only the white point) is tangent to the "inverted spectrum cone", with the "inverted spectrum cone" being symmetrical to the "spectrum cone" with respect to the middle gray point ((0.5, 0.5, 0.5)). This means that, in linear color spaces, the optimal color solid is centrally symmetric.

Optimal color solid or Rösch–MacAdam color solid (with D65 white point) plotted within CIE 1931 XYZ color space. Notice the central symmetry of the solid, and the two sharp edges, one with warm colors and the other one with cool colors.

In most color spaces, the surface of the optimal color solid is smooth, except for two points (black and white); and two sharp edges: the "warm" edge, which goes from black, to red, to orange, to yellow, to white; and the "cool" edge, which goes from black, to deep violet, to blue, to cyan, to white. This is due to the following: If the portion of the reflectance spectrum of a color is spectral red (which is located at one end of the spectrum), it will be seen as black. If the size of the portion of total reflectance is increased, now covering from the red end of the spectrum to the yellow wavelengths, it will be seen as red or orange. If the portion is expanded even more, covering some green wavelengths, it will be seen as yellow. If it is expanded even more, it will cover more wavelengths than the yellow semichrome does, approaching white, until it is reached when the full spectrum is reflected. The described process is called "cumulation". Cumulation can be started at either end of the visible spectrum (we just described cumulation starting from the red end of the spectrum, generating the "warm" sharp edge), cumulation starting at the violet end of the spectrum will generate the "cool" sharp edge.

Optimal color solid plotted within the CIE L* u* v* color space, with D65 white point. Notice that it has two sharp edges, one with warm colors, and the other one with cool colors.

On modern computers, it is possible to calculate an optimal color solid with great precision in seconds. Usually, only the MacAdam limits (the optimal colors, the boundary of the Optimal color solid) are computed, because all the other (non-optimal) possible surface colors exist inside the boundary.

MacAdam limits for illuminant CIE F4 in CIE xyY color space

=== Maximum chroma colors, semichromes, or full colors ===
Each hue has a maximum chroma point, semichrome, or full color; objects cannot have a color of that hue with a higher chroma. They are the most chromatic, vibrant colors that objects can have. They were called semichromes or full colors by the German chemist and philosopher Wilhelm Ostwald in the early 20th century.

If B is the complementary wavelength of wavelength A, then the straight line that connects A and B passes through the achromatic axis in a linear color space, such as LMS or CIE 1931 XYZ. If the reflectance spectrum of a color is 1 (100%) for all the wavelengths between A and B, and 0 for all the wavelengths of the other half of the color space, then that color is a maximum chroma color, semichrome, or full color (this is the explanation to why they were called semichromes). Thus, maximum chroma colors are a type of optimal color.

As explained, full colors are far from being monochromatic (physically, not perceptually). If the spectral purity of a semichrome is increased, its chroma decreases, because it will approach the visible spectrum, ergo, it will approach black.

In perceptually uniform color spaces, the lightness of the full colors varies from around 30% in the violetish blue hues, to around 90% in the yellowish hues. The chroma of each maximum chroma point also varies depending on the hue; in optimal color solids plotted in perceptually uniform color spaces, semichromes like red, green, violet, and magenta have a high chroma, while semichromes like yellow, orange, and cyan have a slightly lower chroma.

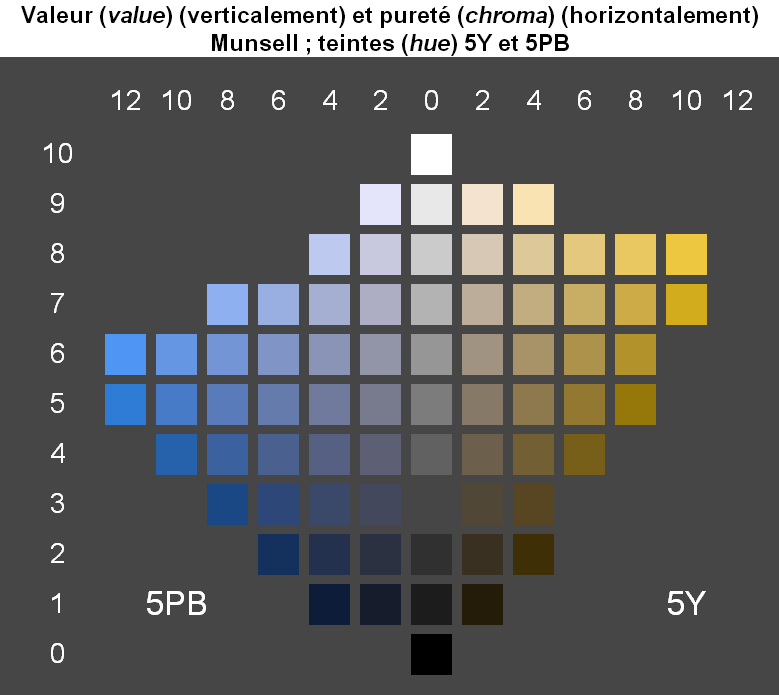
Slice of the Munsell color space in the hues of 5PB and 5Y. The point farthest from the achromatic axis in each of these two hue slices is the maximum chroma color, semichrome, or full color of that hue

== Cultural perspective ==
The meanings and associations of colors can play a major role in works of art, including literature.

=== Associations ===
Individual colors have a variety of cultural associations such as national colors (in general described in individual color articles and color symbolism). The field of color psychology attempts to identify the effects of color on human emotion and activity. Chromotherapy is a pseudoscientific therapy attributed to various Eastern traditions. Colors have different associations in different countries and cultures.

Different colors have been demonstrated to have effects on cognition. For example, researchers at the University of Linz in Austria demonstrated that the color red significantly decreases cognitive functioning in men. The combination of the colors red and yellow together can induce hunger, which has been capitalized on by a number of chain restaurants.

Color plays a role in memory development too. A photograph that is in black and white is slightly less memorable than one in color. Studies also show that wearing bright colors makes one more memorable to people they meet.

=== Terminology ===
Colors vary in several different ways, including hue (shades of red, orange, yellow, green, blue, and violet, etc.), saturation, brightness. Some color words are derived from the name of an object of that color, such as "orange" or "salmon", while others are abstract, like "red".

In the 1969 study Basic Color Terms: Their Universality and Evolution, Brent Berlin and Paul Kay describe a pattern in naming "basic" colors (like "red" but not "red-orange" or "dark red" or "blood red", which are "shades" of red). All languages that have two "basic" color names distinguish dark/cool colors from bright/warm colors. The next colors to be distinguished are usually red and then yellow or green. Languages with six "basic" colors were said to include black, white, red, green, blue, and yellow. Berlin and Kay described further similarities between languages up to a set of twelve: black, gray, white, pink, red, orange, yellow, green, blue, purple, brown, and azure (distinct from blue in Russian and Italian, but not English).

== See also ==
- Chromophore
- Color analysis
- Color in Chinese culture
- Color mapping
- Complementary colors
- Impossible color
- International Color Consortium
- International Commission on Illumination
- Lists of colors (compact version)
- Neutral color
- Pearlescent coating including Metal effect pigments
- Pseudocolor
- Primary, secondary and tertiary colors
