= Metamerism (color) =

Perceived matching of colors in colorimetry

Illustration of color metamerism: In column 1, a ball is illuminated by monochromatic light. Multiplying the spectrum by the cones' spectral sensitivity curves gives the response for each cone type. In column 2, metamerism is used to simulate the scene with blue, green and red LEDs, giving a similar response.

In colorimetry, metamerism is a perceived matching of colors with different (nonmatching) spectral power distributions. Colors that match this way are called metamers.

A spectral power distribution describes the proportion of total light given off (emitted, transmitted, or reflected) by a color sample at each visible wavelength; it defines the complete information about the light coming from the sample. However, most human eyes contain only three color receptors (three types of cone cells), which means that all colors are reduced to three sensory quantities, called the tristimulus values. Metamerism occurs because each type of cone responds to the cumulative energy from a broad range of wavelengths, so that different combinations of light across all wavelengths can produce an equivalent receptor response and the same tristimulus values or color sensation. In color science, the set of sensory spectral sensitivity curves is numerically represented by color matching functions.

== Sources of metamerism ==
Metameric matches are quite common, especially in near neutral (grayed or whitish colors) or dark colors. As colors become brighter or more saturated, the range of possible metameric matches (different combinations of light wavelengths) becomes smaller, especially in colors from surface reflectance spectra.

Metameric matches made between two light sources provide the trichromatic basis of colorimetry. The basis for nearly all commercially available color image reproduction processes such as photography, television, printing, and digital imaging, is the ability to make metameric color matches.

Making metameric matches using reflective materials is more complex. The appearance of surface colors is defined by the product of the spectral reflectance curve of the material and the spectral emittance curve of the light source shining on it. As a result, the color of surfaces depends on the light source used to illuminate them.

== Metameric failure ==
The term illuminant metameric failure or illuminant metamerism is sometimes used to describe situations in which two material samples match when viewed under one light source but not another. Most types of fluorescent lights produce an irregular or peaky spectral emittance curve, so that two materials under fluorescent light might not match, even though they are a metameric match to an incandescent "white" light source with a nearly flat or smooth emittance curve. Material colors that match under one source will often appear different under the other. Inkjet printing is particularly susceptible, and inkjet proofs are best viewed under a 5000K color temperature lighting source, with good color rendering properties, for color accuracy.

Normally, material attributes such as translucency, gloss or surface texture are not considered in color matching. However geometric metameric failure or geometric metamerism can occur when two samples match when viewed from one angle, but then fail to match when viewed from a different angle. A common example is the color variation that appears in pearlescent automobile finishes or "metallic" paper; e.g., Kodak Endura Metallic, Fujicolor Crystal Archive Digital Pearl.

Observer metameric failure or observer metamerism can occur because of differences in color vision between observers. The common source of observer metameric failure is colorblindness, but it can also occur among "normal" observers. In all cases, the proportion of long-wavelength-sensitive cones to medium-wavelength-sensitive cones in the retina, the profile of light sensitivity in each type of cone, and the amount of yellowing in the lens and macular pigment of the eye, differs from one person to the next. This alters the relative importance of different wavelengths in a spectral power distribution to each observer's color perception. As a result, two spectrally dissimilar lights or surfaces may produce a color match for one observer but fail to match when viewed by a second observer.

Field-size metameric failure or field-size metamerism occurs because the relative proportions of the three cone types in the retina vary from the center of the visual field to the periphery, so that colors that match when viewed as very small, centrally fixated areas may appear different when presented as large color areas. In many industrial applications, large-field color matches are used to define color tolerances.

Finally, device metamerism comes up due to the lack of consistency of colorimeters of the same or different manufacturers. Colorimeters basically consist of a combination of a matrix of sensor cells and optical filters, which present an unavoidable variance in their measurements. Moreover, devices built by different manufacturers can differ in their construction.

The difference in the spectral compositions of two metameric stimuli is often referred to as the degree of metamerism. The sensitivity of a metameric match to any changes in the spectral elements that form the colors depend on the degree of metamerism. Two stimuli with a high degree of metamerism are likely to be very sensitive to any changes in the illuminant, material composition, observer, field of view, and so on.

The word metamerism is often used to indicate a metameric failure rather than a match, or used to describe a situation in which a metameric match is easily degraded by a slight change in conditions, such as a change in the illuminant.

== Measuring metamerism ==
One metric, for daylight simulators, is the MI, the CIE metamerism index, which is derived by calculating the mean color difference of eight metamers (five in the visible spectrum and three in the ultraviolet range)^{[ Why UV?]} in CIELAB or CIELUV.

MI can be decomposed into MI_{vis} and MI_{UV} if only part of the spectrum is being considered. The numerical result can be interpreted by rounding into one of five letter categories:

Category	MI (CIELAB)	MI (CIELUV)
A	< 0.25	< 0.32
B	0.25–0.5	0.32–0.65
C	0.5–1.0	0.65–1.3
D	1.0–2.0	1.3–2.6
E	> 2.0	> 2.6

== Metamerism and industry ==
Using materials that are metameric color matches rather than spectral color matches is a significant problem in industries where color matching or color tolerances are important.

=== Automobile industry ===
A classic example is the automobile industry: the colorants used for interior fabrics, plastics and paints may be chosen to provide a good color match under a cool white fluorescent source, but the matches can disappear under different light sources (e.g. daylight or tungsten source). Furthermore, because of the differences in colorants, spectral matches are infrequent and metamerism often occurs.

=== Textile industry ===
Color matching in the textile dyeing industry is essential. In this branch, three types of metamerism are commonly encountered: illuminant metamerism, observer metamerism and field-size metamerism. Due to the wide range of different illuminants in modern life, textile color matching is difficult to ensure. Metamerism on large textile items can be resolved by using different light sources when comparing colors. However, metamerism in smaller items such as textile fibers, is more difficult to be solved. This difficulty arises due to the necessity of a microscope, which has one single illumination source, to observe these small fibers. Therefore, metameric fibres cannot be distinguished neither macroscopically nor microscopically. A method which can solve metamerism in fibres combines microscopy and spectroscopy, and is called microspectroscopy.

=== Paint industry ===
Color matches made in the paint industry are often aimed at achieving a spectral color match rather than just a tristimulus (metameric) color match under a given spectrum of light. A spectral color match attempts to give two colors the same spectral reflectance characteristic, making them a good metameric match with a low degree of metamerism, and thereby reducing the sensitivity of the resulting color match to changes in illuminant, or differences between observers. One way to circumvent metamerism in paints is by using exactly the same pigment and base color compositions in the reproductions as the ones which were used in the original. When the composition of pigment and base color is unknown, metamerism can be avoided only with the use of colorimetric devices.

=== Printing industry ===
The printing industry is also affected by metamerism. Inkjet printers do the mixing of colors under a specific light source, resulting in a modified appearance of original and copy under different light sources. One way to minimize metamerism in printing is by first measuring the spectral reflectance of an object or reproduction using a color measurement device. Then, one selects a set of ink compositions corresponding to the color reflectance factor, which are used by the inkjet printer for the reproduction. The process is repeated until original and reproduction present an acceptable degree of metamerism. Sometimes, however, one reaches the conclusion that an improved match is not possible with the materials available either due to gamut limitations or colorimetric properties.

== See also ==
- Tetrachromacy
- Hyperspectral imaging

== Notes ==
^{Why UV?} Humans generally do not see the UV (ultraviolet) portion of the spectrum directly, but some materials will include optical brighteners which fluoresce. These absorb the normally invisible UV light and then re-emit that energy within the visible range, which in turn means that changing the illumination, even only within the UV range, can change the visual effect.
