= HDR10 =

Open HDR standard

- Status: In force
- Year started: August 27, 2015; 11 years ago
- Organization: Consumer Technology Association (CTA)
- Base standards: HDR10
- Related standards: HDR10+
- Domain: High Dynamic Range (HDR) Video Technology

HDR10 Media Profile, more commonly known as HDR10, is an open high-dynamic-range video (HDR) standard announced on 27 August 2015 by the Consumer Electronics Association (renamed the Consumer Technology Association in 2016). It is the most widespread HDR format.

HDR10 is not backward compatible with SDR. It includes HDR static metadata but not dynamic metadata.

PQ10 refers to an HDR10 format which does not include any metadata.

== Technical details ==
HDR10 is defined as:

- EOTF: SMPTE ST 2084 (PQ).
- Bit depth: 10 bits.
- Color primaries: ITU-R BT.2020 (identical to BT.2100 primaries).
- Static metadata: SMPTE ST 2086 (mastering display color volume), MaxFALL (maximum frame-average light level), and MaxCLL (maximum content light level)
- Color sub-sampling: 4:2:0 (for compressed video sources).

PQ10 refers to an HDR format that uses perceptual quantizer, 10-bit and Rec. 2100 color primaries without having any metadata.

HDR10 is technically limited to a maximum of 10,000 nits peak brightness; however, common HDR10 content is mastered with peak brightness from 1,000 to 4,000 nits.

HDR10 is not backwards compatible with SDR displays.

On HDR10 displays that have lower color volume than the HDR10 content (for example, lower peak brightness capability), the HDR10 metadata gives information to help adjust the content. However, the metadata is static (remains the same for the entire video) and does not tell how the content should be adjusted. Thus, the decision is up to the display and the creative intents might not be preserved.

Competing formats to HDR10 are Dolby Vision and HDR10+ (which do provide dynamic metadata, allowing to preserve the creative intents on each display and on a scene-by-scene or frame-by-frame basis), and also HLG (which provides some degree of backward compatibility with SDR).

== Adoption ==
HDR10 is supported by a wide variety of companies, which include monitor and TV manufacturers such as Dell, LG, Samsung, Sharp, VU, Sony, and Vizio, as well as Sony Interactive Entertainment, Microsoft and Apple which support HDR10 on their PlayStation 4, Xbox One video game console and Apple TV platforms, respectively.

=== Hardware ===
- TV
- Audio-video interfaces
- Smartphone displays
- Smartphone cameras
- Digital cameras
- Mobile SoC
- Game consoles

=== Contents ===
- Ultra HD Blu-ray
- Streaming services

=== Software ===
- Media player
- Color grading

== See also ==
- High-dynamic-range television
