= Dolby Vision =

Set of technologies by Dolby Laboratories

- Inception: 2014
- Website: https://www.dolby.com/technologies/dolby-vision/

Dolby Vision is a set of technologies developed by Dolby Laboratories and Christie Digital Systems for high-dynamic-range (HDR) video. It covers content creation, distribution, and playback. It includes dynamic metadata that define the aspect ratio and adjust the picture based on a display's capabilities on a per-shot or even per-frame basis, optimizing the presentation.

Dolby Vision was introduced in 2014, making it the first available HDR format. HDR10+ is a competitor HDR format that also uses dynamic metadata.

Dolby Vision IQ is an update designed to optimize Dolby Vision content according to the ambient light.

Dolby Cinema also uses Dolby Vision in conjunction with Dolby Atmos sound systems, though because of the use of 2.6 gamma and thus 48 nits in SDR theaters, the 108 nits used in Dolby Cinema is already HDR.

== Description ==
Dolby Vision allows for a maximum resolution of 8K, up to 12-bit color depth, and maximum peak brightness of 10,000 nits. However, according to the Dolby Vision white paper, as of 2018, professional reference monitors, such as the Dolby Vision HDR reference monitor, are currently limited to 4,000 nits of peak brightness.

Dolby Vision includes the PQ transfer function, a wide-gamut color space (ITU-R Rec. BT.2020 in YC_{B}C_{R} or IPTPQc2), up to 8K resolution, and for some profiles (FEL) up to 12-bit. It can encode mastering display colorimetry information using static metadata (SMPTE ST 2086) and also provide dynamic metadata (SMPTE ST 2094-10, Dolby format) for each scene or frame.

This dynamic metadata allows adjusting the image on a scene-by-scene or even frame-by-frame basis. These adjustments, called "trims" in Dolby's support documents, include parameters such as Lift, Gamma, Gain, Saturation, Chroma Weight, and so on. Each set of trims is specific to its respective target displays defined by nits and colorspace. Image aspect ratios can also be defined on a per-shot basis.

== Consumer implementations ==
Dolby Vision is supported by a variety of streaming services, home entertainment systems, and consumer devices. Major platforms such as Netflix, Disney+, Apple TV+, and Amazon Prime Video offer movies and TV shows in Dolby Vision, enhancing color accuracy, brightness, and contrast for a more immersive viewing experience.

In addition to films and television, Dolby Vision is also used for concert films and live entertainment streaming. Services like On Air offer high-quality concert experiences in Dolby Vision, providing viewers with a cinematic at-home concert experience.

== Technical details ==
The Dolby Vision format is capable of representing videos with a peak brightness up to 10,000 cd/m^{2} and a color gamut up to Rec. 2020. Current displays cannot reproduce the full Dolby Vision brightness and gamut capability. There are no brightness and color gamut capability requirements for consumer displays. When the consumer display has lower color volume than the mastering display, the content is adjusted to the consumer display capability based on the dynamic metadata.

Dolby Vision mastering displays require:

- EOTF: PQ
- Peak brightness: at least 1,000 cd/m^{2}
- Black level: at most 0.005 cd/m^{2}
- Contrast ratio: at least 200,000:1
- Color gamut: at least 99% of P3

=== Metadata ===
Dolby Vision metadata include:

- L0 (static): Mastering and target display characteristics
- L1 (dynamic): Automatically generated
- L2 trims (dynamic): Manually generated per frame or per scene
- L3 trims (dynamic): Manually generated per frame or per scene (since CMv4.0)
- L8 trims (dynamic): Manually generated per frame or per scene (since CMv4.0) (equivalent of L2 trims)
- L5: Timeline aspect ratio description
- L6 (static and optional): MaxCLL and MaxFALL (required for HDR10)
- L9 (dynamic): Mastering display color primaries (since CMv4.0)

Dolby Vision CMv4.0 introduces new secondary trims for hue and saturation adjustment.

=== Profiles ===
Dolby Vision profiles
Profile	Codec	BL:EL resolution	Backward compatibility
5	10-bit HEVC	No enhancement layer	None (It uses proprietary IPTPQc2)
7	10-bit HEVC	1:1/4 for UHD; 1:1 for FHD	Ultra HD Blu-ray
8	10-bit HEVC	No enhancement layer	HDR10 or SDR or HLG
9	8-bit AVC High or High Progressive Profile	No enhancement layer	SDR
10	10-bit AV1	No enhancement layer	None or HDR10 or SDR or HLG
20	10bit MV-HEVC for 3D or HEVC for 2D	No enhancement layer	None (It uses proprietary IPTPQc2)

Profiles not supported for new applications
Profile	Codec	BL:EL resolution	Backward compatibility
0	AVC	1:1/4	SDR
1	AVC	1:1	None
2	8-bit HEVC	1:1/4	SDR
3	8-bit HEVC	1:1	None
4	10-bit HEVC	1:1/4	SDR
6	10-bit HEVC	1:1/4	HDR10
8	10-bit HEVC	No enhancement layer	

=== Dual layer ===
Some Dolby Vision profiles are dual-layer (for example: the profile 7 used for Ultra HD Blu-ray). The base layer (BL) and the enhancement layer (EL) are combined to produce a 12-bit video stream.

The enhancement layer can be a full enhancement layer (FEL) or a minimum enhancement layer (MEL).

=== File formats ===
- ISO Base Media File Format
  - MP4
  - DECE
  - Common File Format (CFF)
  - Protected Interoperable File Format (PIFF)
- HTTP Live Streaming
- MPEG-2 Transport Stream Format
- MPEG-DASH
- MKV

== License ==
Dolby Vision is a proprietary solution by Dolby.

In 2021, compatible color grading systems can create Dolby Vision automatic metadata with no additional cost for content creators. A $2,500 annual license is required to activate the trims, allowing content creators to manually adjust the video. OEM and manufacturer of a grading, mastering, editorial, or other professional application or device need to apply for a license.

Dolby SVP of Business Giles Baker has stated that the royalty cost for Dolby Vision is less than $3 per TV.

Despite the proprietary nature, several free software implementations of Dolby Vision exist (see § Software).

== Adoption ==
=== Hardware ===
- Televisions:
  - Bang & Olufsen
  - Hisense
  - LG
  - Loewe
  - Panasonic
  - Philips
  - Sony
  - TCL
  - Vizio
  - Xiaomi
  - Sharp
  - Toshiba
  - Skyworth
  - Haier
- Monitors:
  - Asus
  - Apple: Pro Display XDR
- Laptops:
  - Apple: MacBook Air (2018 and newer), and MacBook Pro (2018 and newer)
- All-in-one computers
  - Apple: iMac (2020 and newer), and iMac Pro
- Smartphones:
  - Display:
    - LG G6
    - iPhone 8/8 Plus, X, XS/XS Max, XR, 11, 11 Pro/11 Pro Max, SE (2nd generation), 12/12 mini, 12 Pro/12 Pro Max and 13/13 mini, 13 Pro/13 Pro Max. (Note: iPhone 8/8 Plus, XR, 11, and SE (2nd generation) can play Dolby Vision content despite not having an HDR-ready display, done by down-converting the HDR content to fit the display while still having some enhancements to dynamic range, contrast, and wide color gamut compared to standard content.)
    - Xiaomi Mi 11 Ultra, Mi 11 Pro
    - realme GT 7
  - Camera:
    - iPhone 12/12 mini, 12 Pro/12 Pro Max, iPhone 13/13 mini, 13 Pro/13 Pro Max, iPhone 14/14 Plus, 14 Pro/14 Pro Max, iPhone 15/15 Plus, 15 Pro/15 Pro Max, iPhone 16e, 16/16 Plus, 16 Pro/16 Pro Max, iPhone 17, 17 Pro/17 Pro Max, and iPhone Air
    - Xiaomi 12S Ultra
    - Xiaomi Mix Fold 2
    - Xiaomi 13/13 Pro
    - Vivo X90 Pro+
    - realme GT 7
- Gaming consoles:
  - Xbox One X/S: Streaming apps only.
  - Xbox Series X/S: Streaming apps and gaming.
- Other:
  - Apple Vision Pro
  - Nvidia Shield TV (from 2019)

=== Content distribution ===
- Ultra HD Blu-ray
- Streaming services
  - Amazon Prime Video
  - Apple TV+
  - Bilibili
  - Disney+
  - Disney+ Hotstar
  - Eros Now
  - Fandango
  - HBO Max
  - Hulu
  - iQIYI
  - Netflix
  - On Air
  - Paramount+
  - Peacock
  - Rakuten TV
  - SonyLIV
  - Tencent Video
  - Vimeo
  - ZEE5

=== Software ===
- Media players:
  - mpv, the first free software player to support Profile 5
  - Libplacebo (part of the VideoLAN project) has support for Dolby Vision Profile 5's IPTPQc2 color space, MMR and reshaping, but no current support for dynamic metadata or NLQ
  - MPC-HC has partial support (profiles 5, 8.1, 8.4) through MPC Video Renderer
  - Exoplayer
  - Shaka Player (device dependent)
  - Windows 10/11 built-in media players (Dolby Vision Extension required, profiles 4/5/8/9 only)
- Encoders:
  - x265: Profile 5, profile 8.1 and profile 8.2 (since version 3.0)
- Color grading software:
  - Autodesk Lustre
  - Autodesk Flame 2021
  - Blackmagic Design Davinci Resolve
  - Digital Vision Nucoda
  - Filmlight Baselight
  - Grass Valley RIO
  - SGO Mistika

== Dolby Vision 2 and Dolby Vision 2 Max ==
On September 2, 2025, Dolby announced their successors to Dolby Vision and Dolby Vision IQ, as well as the first manufacturers to support the new standards. Dolby Vision 2 adds support for "Precision Black", a feature designed to make content easier to watch in extremely dark scenes. It also adds "Light Sense," which utilizes an ambient light sensor to dynamically adjust content display settings to account for the viewing environment. Dolby Vision 2 Max will include extra features beyond the base Vision 2. The first manufacturer to release a Dolby Vision 2 capable display is Hisense.
