= Sony UBP-X700 =

2018 Blu-ray player

- Manufacturer: Sony
- Product family: UBP
- Type: Media player
- Released: January 2018
- Media: Ultra HD Blu-ray
- Dimensions: 320 mm x 45 mm x 217 mm
- Weight: 3lb 1oz (1.4 kg)
- Predecessor: UBP-X800

The Sony UBP-X700 is Sony's Ultra HD Blu-ray player released in 2018.

== Features ==
The player supports HDR10 and Dolby Vision high-dynamic-range standards but not HDR10+. The Dolby Vision support was added after release. There are two HDMI ports, the other being audio only.

Compared to the older model, UBP-X800, X700 supports only single band 2.4 GHz Wi-Fi, while the X800 model supports dual band 5 GHz. The X700 supports Dolby Vision unlike the X800. The X700 is also smaller in physical size and weight.

== Reception ==
TechRadar called it "an effective 4K Blu-ray player that's packed with a good number of features for an affordable price." They also named it "the best budget 4K Blu-ray player". What Hi-Fi? called it a great budget 4K Blu-ray player. They said the X700 has a more naturalistic picture quality than X800 but sounds "a tad lightweight" compared to the X800. CNET said the X800 is pricier but is slightly faster and has a more premium build quality. TechHive wrote: "The UPB-X700 is great disc player/media streamer and a nice upgrade for anyone with a dumb TV or out-of-date disc player." Digital Trends said that "The biggest reasons to buy the X700 are its great video and audio processing." Trusted Reviews said: "The X700 might not be the audiophile’s choice, but considering its price the player is more than capable of delivering a quality experience." Home Cinema Choice wrote: "At this launch price, the UBP-X700 is not quite the bargain 4K spinner, although it's certainly stripped back on connectivity and has the same compact, lightweight design as Panasonic's cheaper DMP-UB320."
