= OETF =

OETF may refer to:

- Ta'if Regional Airport (ICAO code), Saudi Arabia
- Opto-electronic transfer function, in high dynamic range video
