= Chroma subsampling =

Practice of encoding color images

Widely used chroma subsampling formats

Chroma subsampling or color subsampling is the practice of encoding images by implementing less resolution for chroma information than for luma information, taking advantage of the human visual system's lower acuity for color differences than for luminance.

It is used in many video and still image encoding schemes – both analog and digital – including in JPEG encoding.

== Rationale ==
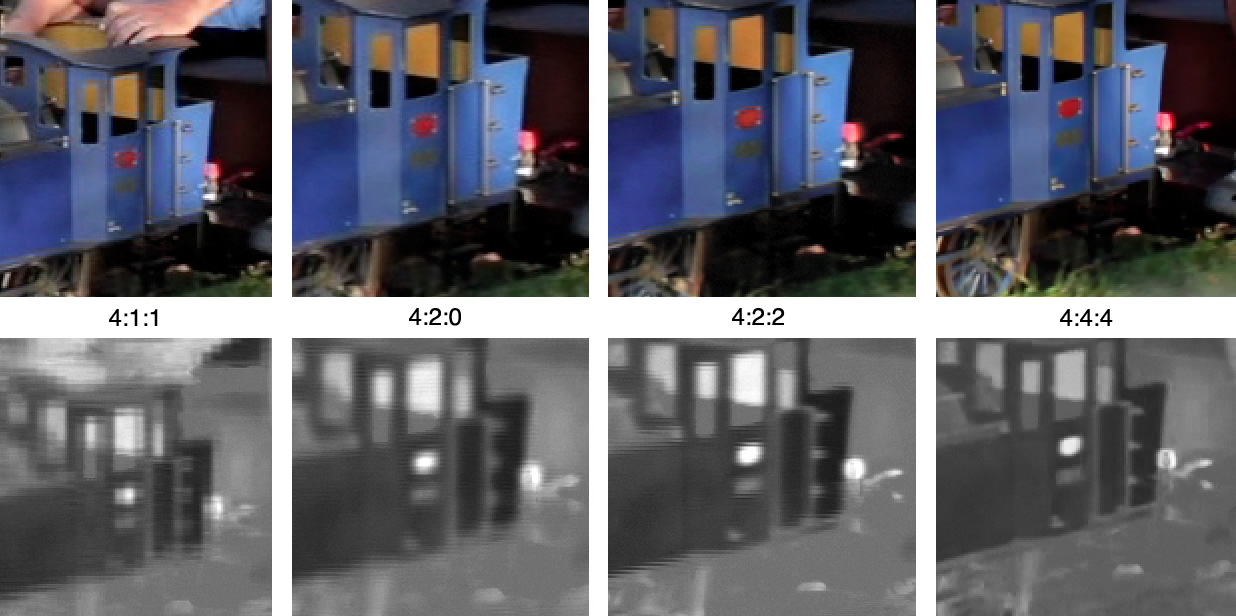
In full size, this image shows the difference between four subsampling schemes. Note how similar the color images appear. The lower row shows the resolution of the color information.

Digital signals are often compressed to reduce file size and save transmission time. Since the human visual system is much more sensitive to variations in brightness than color, a video system can be optimized by devoting more bandwidth to the luma component (usually denoted Y'), than to the color difference components Cb and Cr. In compressed images, for example, the 4:2:2 Y'CbCr scheme requires two-thirds the bandwidth of non-subsampled "4:4:4" R'G'B'. (Note: The prime signs indicates gamma-correction or any non-linear EOTF.) This reduction results in almost no visual difference as perceived by the viewer.

=== How subsampling works ===
The human vision system processes color information (hue and colorfulness) at about a third of the resolution of luminance (lightness/darkness information in an image). Therefore it is possible to sample color information at a lower resolution while maintaining good image quality.

This is achieved by encoding RGB image data into a composite black and white image, with separated color difference data (chroma). For example with $Y'C_bC_r$, gamma encoded $R'G'B'$ components are weighted and then summed together to create the luma $Y'$ component. The color difference components are created by subtracting two of the weighted $R'G'B'$ components from the third. A variety of filtering methods can be used to limit the resolution.

==== Regarding gamma and transfer functions ====
Gamma encoded luma $Y'$ should not be confused with linear luminance $Y$. The presence of gamma encoding is denoted with the prime symbol $'$.

Gamma-correcting electro-optical transfer functions (EOTF) are used due to the nonlinear response of human vision. The use of gamma improves perceived signal-to-noise in analogue systems, and allows for more efficient data encoding in digital systems. This encoding uses more levels for darker colors than for lighter ones, accommodating human vision sensitivity.

== Sampling systems and ratios ==
The subsampling scheme is commonly expressed as a three-part ratio J:a:b (e.g. 4:2:2) or four parts, if alpha channel is present (e.g. 4:2:2:4), that describe the number of luminance and chrominance samples in a conceptual region that is J pixels wide and 2 pixels high. The parts are (in their respective order):

- J: horizontal sampling reference (width of the conceptual region). Usually, 4.
- a: number of chrominance samples (Cr, Cb) in the first row of J pixels.
- b: number of changes of chrominance samples (Cr, Cb) between first and second row of J pixels. b is usually either zero or equal to a (except in rare irregular cases like 4:4:1 and 4:2:1, which do not follow this convention).
- Alpha: horizontal factor (relative to first digit). May be omitted if alpha component is not present, and is equal to J when present.

This notation is not valid for all combinations and has exceptions, e.g. 4:1:0 (where the height of the region is not 2 pixels, but 4 pixels, so if 8 bits per component are used, the media would be 9 bits per pixel) and 4:2:1.

4:1:1	4:2:0	4:2:2	4:4:0	4:4:4
Y'CrCb
=	=	=	=	=
Y'
+	+	+	+	+
1	2	3	4	J	= 4	1	2	3	4	J	= 4	1	2	3	4	J	= 4	1	2	3	4	J	= 4	1	2	3	4	J	= 4
(Cr, Cb)	1	a	= 1	1	2	a	= 2	1	2	a	= 2	1	2	3	4	a	= 4	1	2	3	4	a	= 4
1	b	= 1	b	= 0	1	2	b	= 2	b	= 0	1	2	3	4	b	= 4
¼ horizontal resolution, full vertical resolution	½ horizontal resolution, ½ vertical resolution	½ horizontal resolution, full vertical resolution	full horizontal resolution, ½ vertical resolution	full horizontal resolution, full vertical resolution

The mapping examples given are only theoretical and for illustration. Also the diagram does not indicate any chroma filtering, which should be applied to avoid aliasing. To calculate required bandwidth factor relative to 4:4:4 (or 4:4:4:4), one needs to sum all the factors and divide the result by 12 (or 16, if alpha is present).

== Types of sampling and subsampling ==
=== 4:4:4 ===
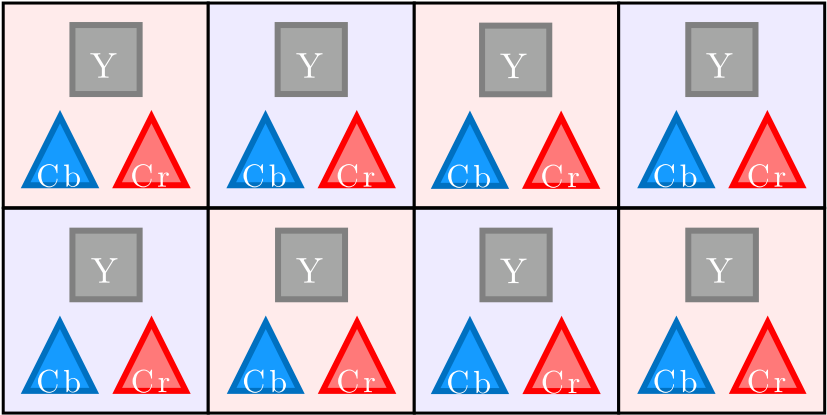
4:4:4 sampling

Each of the three Y'CbCr components has the same sample rate, thus there is no chroma subsampling. This scheme is sometimes used in high-end film scanners and cinematic post-production.

"4:4:4" may instead be wrongly referring to R'G'B' color space, which implicitly also does not have any chroma subsampling (except in JPEG R'G'B' can be subsampled). Formats such as HDCAM SR can record 4:4:4 R'G'B' over dual-link HD-SDI.

=== 4:2:2 ===
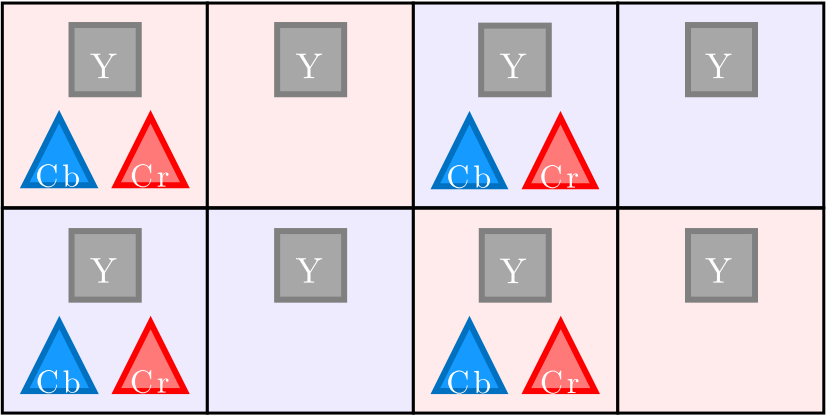
4:2:2 sampling

The two chroma components are sampled at half the horizontal sample rate of luma: the horizontal chroma resolution is halved. This reduces the bandwidth of an uncompressed video signal by one-third, which means for 8 bit per component without alpha (24 bit per pixel) only 16 bits are enough, as in NV16.

Many high-end digital video formats and interfaces use this scheme:

- AVC-Intra 100
- Digital Betacam
- Betacam SX
- DVCPRO50 and DVCPRO HD
- Digital-S
- CCIR 601 / Serial digital interface / D-1
- ProRes (HQ, 422, LT, and Proxy)
- XDCAM HD422
- Canon MXF HD422

=== 4:1:1 ===
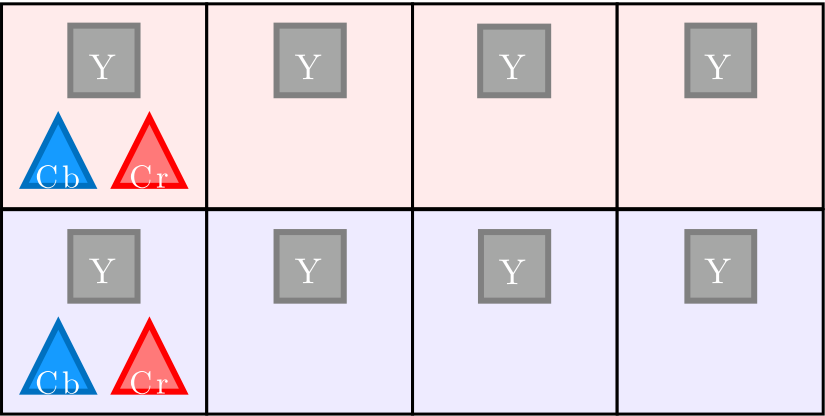
4:1:1 sampling

In 4:1:1 chroma subsampling, the horizontal color resolution is quartered, and the bandwidth is halved compared to no chroma subsampling. Initially, 4:1:1 chroma subsampling of the DV format was not considered to be broadcast quality and was only acceptable for low-end and consumer applications. However, DV-based formats (some of which use 4:1:1 chroma subsampling) have been used professionally in electronic news gathering and in playout servers. DV has also been sporadically used in feature films and in digital cinematography.

In the 480i "NTSC" system, if the luma is sampled at 13.5 MHz, then this means that the Cr and Cb signals will each be sampled at 3.375 MHz, which corresponds to a maximum Nyquist bandwidth of 1.6875 MHz, whereas traditional "high-end broadcast analog NTSC encoder" would have a Nyquist bandwidth of 1.5 MHz and 0.5 MHz for the I/Q channels. However, in most equipment, especially cheap TV sets and VHS/Betamax VCRs, the chroma channels have only the 0.5 MHz bandwidth for both Cr and Cb (or equivalently for I/Q). Thus the DV system actually provides a superior color bandwidth compared to the best composite analog specifications for NTSC, despite having only 1/4 of the chroma bandwidth of a "full" digital signal.

Formats that use 4:1:1 chroma subsampling include:

- DVCPRO / D-7 (NTSC and PAL)
- 480i "NTSC" DV and DVCAM
- YJK, a proprietary color space implemented by the Yamaha V9958 graphic chip on MSX2+ computers.

=== 4:2:0 ===
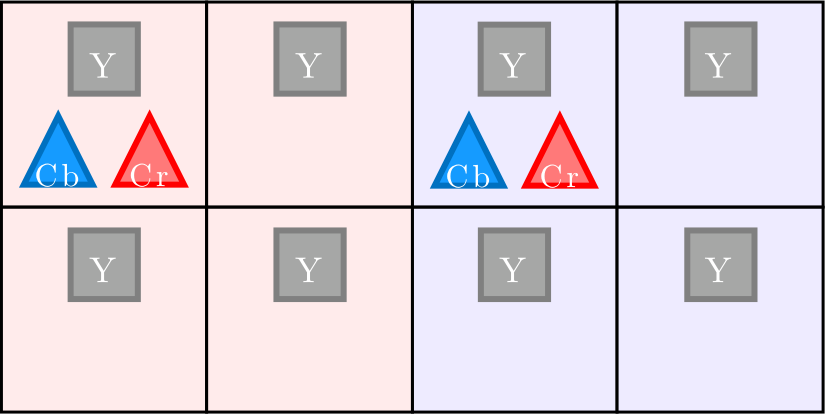
4:2:0 sampling

In 4:2:0, the horizontal sampling is doubled compared to 4:1:1, but as the Cb and Cr channels are only sampled on each alternate line in this scheme, the vertical resolution is halved. The data rate is thus the same. This fits reasonably well with the PAL color encoding system, since this has only half the vertical chrominance resolution of NTSC. It would also fit extremely well with the SECAM color encoding system, since like that format, 4:2:0 only stores and transmits one color channel per line (the other channel being recovered from the previous line). However, little equipment has actually been produced that outputs a SECAM analogue video signal. In general, SECAM territories either have to use a PAL-capable display or a transcoder to convert the PAL signal to SECAM for display.

Different variants of 4:2:0 chroma configurations are found in:

- All ISO/IEC MPEG and ITU-T VCEG H.26x video coding standards including H.262/MPEG-2 Part 2 implementations (although some profiles of MPEG-4 Part 2 and H.264/MPEG-4 AVC allow higher-quality sampling schemes such as 4:4:4)
- DVD-Video and Blu-ray Disc.
- 576i "PAL" DV and DVCAM
- HDV
- AVCHD and AVC-Intra 50
- Apple Intermediate Codec
- Most common JPEG/JFIF and MJPEG implementations
- VC-1
- WebP

Cb and Cr are each subsampled at a factor of 2 both horizontally and vertically. Most digital video formats corresponding to 576i "PAL" use 4:2:0 chroma subsampling.

==== Sampling positions ====
MPEG-2, MPEG-4, and AVC sampling at the midpoint of the left edge

JPEG/JFIF, H.261, and MPEG-1 sampling at the center

There are four main variants of 4:2:0 schemes, having different horizontal and vertical sampling relative to the 2×2 "square" of the original input size.

- In MPEG-2, MPEG-4, and AVC, Cb and Cr are taken on midpoint of the left-edge of the 2×2 square. In other words, they have the same horizontal location as the top-left pixel, but is shifted one-half pixel down vertically. Also called "left".
- In JPEG/JFIF, H.261, and MPEG-1, Cb and Cr are taken at the center of 2×2 the square. In other words, they are offset one-half pixel to the right and one-half pixel down compared to the top-left pixel. Also called "center".
- HEVC sampling at the top-left
  In HEVC for BT.2020 and BT.2100 content (in particular on Blu-rays), Cb and Cr are sampled at the same location as the group's top-left Y pixel ("co-sited", "co-located"). Also called "top-left". An analogous co-sited sampling is used in MPEG-2 4:2:2.
- PAL-DV sampling at the top-left
  In 4:2:0 PAL-DV (IEC 61834-2), Cr is sampled at the same location as the group's top-left Y pixel, but Cb is sampled one pixel down. It is also called "top-left" in ffmpeg.

===== Interlaced and progressive =====
With interlaced material, 4:2:0 chroma subsampling can result in motion artifacts if it is implemented the same way as for progressive material. The luma samples are derived from separate time intervals, while the chroma samples would be derived from both time intervals. It is this difference that can result in motion artifacts. The MPEG-2 standard allows for an alternate interlaced sampling scheme, where 4:2:0 is applied to each field (not both fields at once). This solves the problem of motion artifacts, reduces the vertical chroma resolution by half, and can introduce comb-like artifacts in the image.

Original. This image shows a single field. The moving text has some motion blur applied to it.

4:2:0 progressive sampling applied to moving interlaced material. The chroma leads and trails the moving text. This image shows a single field.

4:2:0 interlaced sampling applied to moving interlaced material. This image shows a single field.

In the 4:2:0 interlaced scheme, however, vertical resolution of the chroma is roughly halved, since the chroma samples effectively describe an area 2 samples wide by 4 samples tall instead of 2×2. As well, the spatial displacement between both fields can result in the appearance of comb-like chroma artifacts.

Original still image.

4:2:0 progressive sampling applied to a still image. Both fields are shown.

4:2:0 interlaced sampling applied to a still image. Both fields are shown.

If the interlaced material is to be de-interlaced, the comb-like chroma artifacts (from 4:2:0 interlaced sampling) can be removed by blurring the chroma vertically.

=== 4:1:0 ===
This ratio is possible, and some codecs support it, but it is not widely used. This ratio uses half of the vertical and one-fourth the horizontal color resolutions, with only one-eighth of the bandwidth of the maximum color resolutions used. Uncompressed video in this format with 8-bit quantization uses 10 bytes for every macropixel (which is 4×2 pixels) or 10 bit for every pixel. It has the equivalent chrominance bandwidth of a PAL-I or PAL-M signal decoded with a delay line decoder, and still very much superior to NTSC.

=== 3:1:1 ===
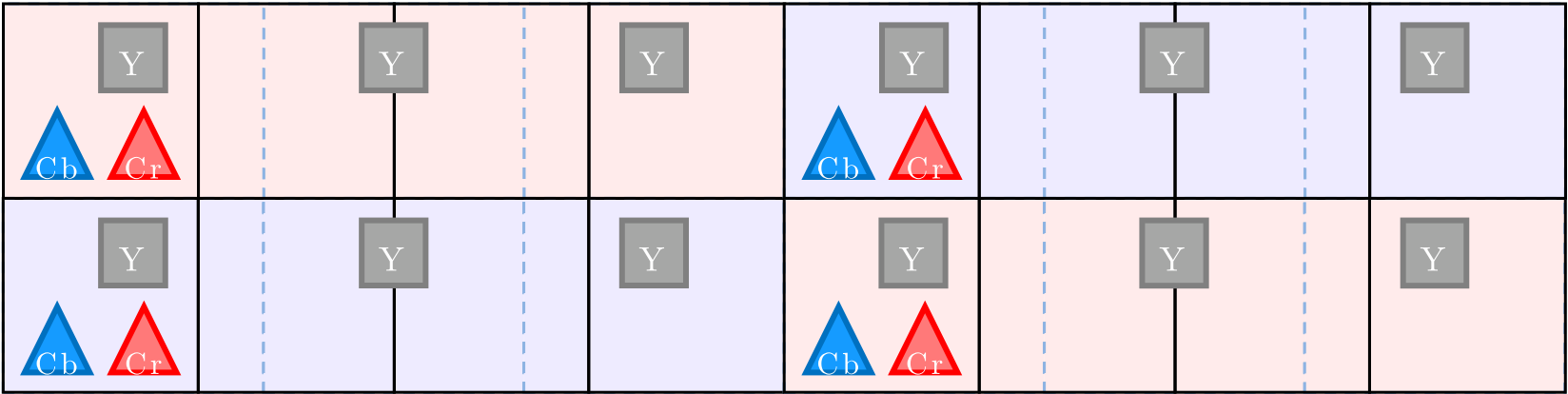
3:1:1 sampling

Used by Sony in their HDCAM High Definition recorders (not HDCAM SR). In the horizontal dimension, luma is sampled horizontally at three quarters of the full HD sampling rate – 1440 samples per row instead of 1920. Chroma is sampled at 480 samples per row, a third of the luma sampling rate. In the vertical dimension, both luma and chroma are sampled at the full HD sampling rate (1080 samples vertically).

=== Different Cb and Cr rates ===
A number of legacy schemes allow different subsampling factors in Cb and Cr, similar to how a different amount of bandwidth is allocated to the two chroma values in broadcast systems such as CCIR System M. These schemes are not expressible in J:a:b notation. Instead, they adopt a Y:Cb:Cr notation, with each part describing the amount of resolution for the corresponding component. It is unspecified whether the resolution reduction happens in the horizontal or vertical direction.

- In JPEG, 4:4:2 and 4:2:1 half the vertical resolution of Cb compared to 4:4:4 and 4:4:0.
- In another version of 4:2:1, Cb horizontal resolution is half that of Cr (and a quarter of the horizontal resolution of Y).
- 4:1:0.5 or 4:1:0.25 are variants of 4:1:0 with reduced horizontal resolution on Cb, similar to VHS quality.

== Artifacts ==
Original image without color subsampling. 200% zoom.

Image after color subsampling (Sony Vegas DV codec, box filtering.)

Note the bleeding in lightness near the borders.

Chroma subsampling suffers from two main types of artifacts, causing degradation more noticeable than intended where colors change abruptly.

=== Gamma luminance error ===
Gamma-corrected signals like Y'CbCr have an issue where chroma errors "bleed" into luma. In those signals, a low chroma actually makes a color appear less bright than one with equivalent luma. As a result, when a saturated color blends with an unsaturated or complementary color, a loss of luminance occurs at the border. This can be seen in the example between magenta and green. This issue persists in HDR video where gamma is generalized into a transfer function "EOTF". A steeper EOTF shows a stronger luminance loss.

Some proposed corrections of this issue are:

- Luma-weighted average (Kornelski, experiment for mozjpeg)
- Iterative sharp YUV method, used by WebP and optionally AVIF. Sharp YUV assumes a bilinear upscaling for chroma.
- RGB subsampling in linear space before chroma subsampling (HDRTools)
- Iterative or closed-form luma correction to minimize luminance error (HDRTools)

Rec. 2020 defines a "constant luminance" Yc'CbcCrc, which is calculated from linear RGB components and then gamma-encoded. This version does not suffer from the luminance loss by design.

=== Gamut clipping ===
Another artifact that can occur with chroma subsampling is that out-of-gamut colors can occur upon chroma reconstruction. Suppose the image consisted of alternating 1-pixel red and black lines and the subsampling omitted the chroma for the black pixels. Chroma from the red pixels will be reconstructed onto the black pixels, causing the new pixels to have positive red and negative green and blue values. As displays cannot output negative light (negative light does not exist), these negative values will effectively be clipped, and the resulting luma value will be too high. Other sub-sampling filters (especially the averaging "box") have a similar issue that is harder to make a simple example out of. Similar artifacts arise in the less artificial example of gradation near a fairly sharp red/black boundary.

It is possible for the decoder to deal with out-of-gamut colors by considering how much chroma a given luma value can hold and distribute it into the 4:4:4 intermediate accordingly, termed "in-range chroma reconstruction" by Glenn Chan. The "proportion" method is in spirit similar to Kornelski's luma-weighted average, while the "spill" method resembles error diffusion. Improving chroma reconstruction remains an active field of research.

== Terminology ==
The term Y'UV refers to an analog TV encoding scheme (ITU-R Rec. BT.470) while Y'CbCr refers to a digital encoding scheme. One difference between the two is that the scale factors on the chroma components (U, V, Cb, and Cr) are different. However, the term YUV is often used erroneously to refer to Y'CbCr encoding. Hence, expressions like "4:2:2 YUV" always refer to 4:2:2 Y'CbCr, since there simply is no such thing as 4:x:x in analog encoding (such as YUV). Pixel formats used in Y'CbCr can be referred to as YUV too, for example yuv420p, yuvj420p and many others.

In a similar vein, the term luminance and the symbol Y are often used erroneously to refer to luma, which is denoted with the symbol Y'. The luma (Y') of video engineering deviates from the luminance (Y) of color science (as defined by CIE). Luma is formed as the weighted sum of gamma-corrected (tristimulus) RGB components. Luminance is formed as a weighed sum of linear (tristimulus) RGB components. In practice, the CIE symbol Y is often incorrectly used to denote luma. In 1993, SMPTE adopted Engineering Guideline EG 28, clarifying the two terms. The prime symbol ' is used to indicate gamma correction.

Similarly, the chroma of video engineering differs from the chrominance of color science. The chroma of video engineering is formed from weighted tristimulus components (gamma corrected, OETF), not linear components. In video engineering practice, the terms chroma, chrominance, and saturation are often used interchangeably to refer to chroma, but it is not a good practice, as ITU-T Rec H.273 says.

== History ==
Chroma subsampling was developed in the 1950s by Alda Bedford for the development of color television by RCA, which developed into the NTSC standard; luma–chroma separation was developed earlier, in 1938 by Georges Valensi. Through studies, he showed that the human eye has high resolution only for black and white, somewhat less for "mid-range" colors like yellows and greens, and much less for colors on the end of the spectrum, reds and blues. This knowledge allowed RCA to develop a system in which they discarded most of the blue signal after it comes from the camera, keeping most of the green and only some of the red; this is chroma subsampling in the YIQ color space and is roughly analogous to 4:2:1 subsampling, in that it has decreasing resolution for luma, yellow/green, and red/blue.

== See also ==
- Color
- Color space
- Color vision
  - Rod cell
  - Cone cell
- Digital video
- High-definition television
- Multiple sub-Nyquist sampling encoding
- Rec. 601 4:2:2 SDTV
- Rec. 709 (BT.709) HDTV
- SMPTE – Society of Motion Picture and Television Engineers
- YCbCr
- YJK
- Hold-And-Modify
- YPbPr
- YUV
