= HDR10+ =

Video technology that adds dynamic metadata to HDR10 source files

- Status: In force
- Year started: April 20, 2017; 9 years ago
- Organization: HDR10+ Technologies LLC
- Base standards: HDR10+ Advanced; HDR10+ Adaptive; HDR10+ Gaming
- Related standards: HDR10
- Domain: High Dynamic Range (HDR) Video Technology
- Website: hdr10plus.org

HDR10+ is a high dynamic range (HDR) video technology introduced by Samsung Electronics Co., Ltd, 20th Century Fox Home Entertainment and Panasonic Corporation.

The platform addresses limitations of static HDR formats by enabling dynamic adjustment of visual parameters, thereby more faithfully reproducing filmmakers’ creative intent. Licensing of HDR10+ commenced in 2018.

== Description ==
HDR10+, also known as HDR10 Plus, was announced on 20 April 2017, by Samsung and Amazon Video. HDR10+ updates HDR10 by adding dynamic metadata that can be used to more accurately adjust brightness levels up to the full range of PQ code values (10,000 nits maximum brightness) on a scene-by-scene or frame-by-frame basis. The technology is standardized and defined in SMPTE ST 2094-40. HDR10+ is an open standard and is royalty-free; it is supported by a growing list of post-production software and tools. HDR10+ specifications are not publicly available. A certification and logo program for HDR10+ device manufacturers is available with an annual administration fee for certain adopter categories and no per-unit royalty. Authorized test centers conduct certification testing for HDR10+ devices.

On 28 August 2017, Samsung, Panasonic, and 20th Century Fox created the HDR10+ Technologies LLC to promote the HDR10+ standard. HDR10+ video started being offered by Amazon Video on 13 December 2017. On 5 January 2018, Warner Bros. announced their support for the HDR10+ standard. On 6 January 2018, Panasonic announced Ultra HD Blu-ray players with support for HDR10+. On 4 April 2019, Universal Pictures Home Entertainment announced a technology collaboration with Samsung Electronics to release new titles mastered with HDR10+.

HDR10+ signals the dynamic range and scene characteristics on a scene-by-scene or even frame-by-frame basis. The display device then uses the dynamic metadata to apply an appropriate tone map through the process of dynamic tone mapping. Dynamic tone mapping differs from static tone mapping by applying a different tone curve from scene-to-scene rather than use a single tone curve for an entire video.

== Technical details ==
=== HDR10+ content profile ===
- EOTF: SMPTE ST 2084 (PQ)
- Chroma subsampling: 4:2:0 (for compressed video sources), 4:2:2 and 4:4:4
- Resolution: Agnostic (2K/4K/8K, etc.)
- Bit depth: 10-bit or more (up to 16-bit) per color channel
- Color primaries: ITU-R BT.2020
- Maximum linearized pixel value: 10,000 cd/m^{2} for each color R/G/B (content)
- Metadata (required): Mastering Display Color Volume Metadata
- Metadata (optional): MaxCLL, MaxFALL

HDR10+ supports the full range PQ up to 10,000 cd/m^{2}. Being resolution agnostic, metadata needs to be created only once and can be applied to any target resolution.

HDR10+ content can be encoded using video encoding technologies including HEVC (implemented with VSEI) and AV1, VP9 compatibility is achieved via the WebM container.

=== Workflow and ecosystem ===
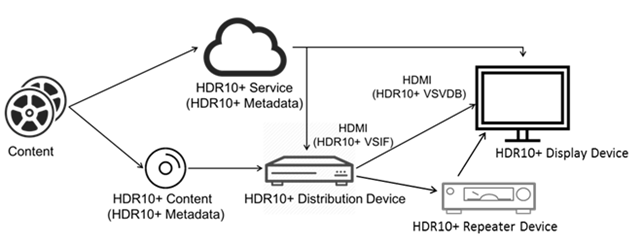
HDR10+ distribution ecosystem

HDR10+ utilizes an HDR10 master file within existing HDR post-production and distribution workflows.

The HDR10+ ecosystem is used within current systems by,

- storing HDR10+ metadata in JSON files
- embedding HDR10+ metadata into HDR10 encoded content
- distribution through digital stream (e.g. streaming with HDR10+ SEI)
- displaying HDR10+ content on a capable display (e.g. HDMI interfaces with HDR10+ VSIF) and mobile devices

=== Metadata generation ===
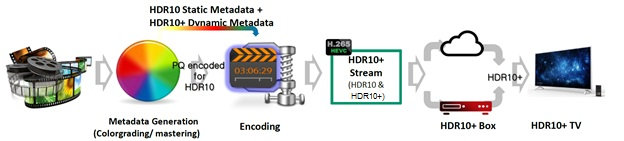
HDR10+ metadata workflow

For offline and video-on-demand (VOD) (e.g. ultra-high-definition Blu-ray, over-the-top (OTT), multi-channel video programming distributor (MVPD)), HDR10+ metadata may be created during the post-production mastering process or during transcoding/encoding for distribution back-ends by HDR10+ content generation tools in two steps:

1. Identifying scene cuts, and
2. Performing an image analysis on each scene or frame to derive statistics

HDR10+ metadata is interchanged through a low complexity JSON-structured text file, which is then parsed and injected into video files.

=== Live encoding ===
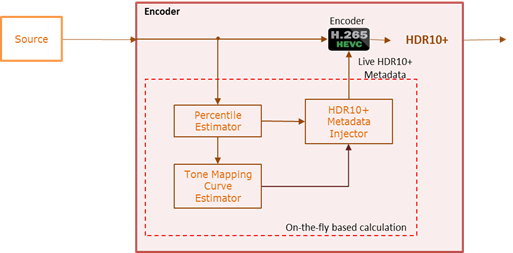
HDR10+ live encoder workflow

Live use cases are possible by delivering HDR10+ metadata in every frame. HEVC encoders generate and inject metadata on live content and mobile phones record video and create HDR10+ metadata in real-time during recording. Live encoding is detailed in the Live Encoder Workflow diagram and real time broadcast operations are supported at the point of transmission enabling a metadata-less broadcast operation.

=== Compatibility ===
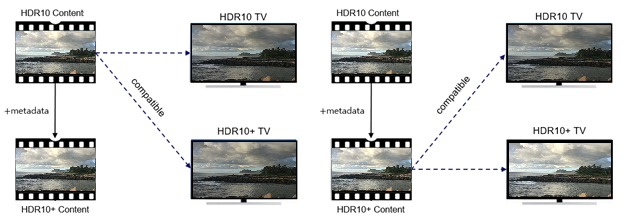
HDR10+ backward compatibility

HDR10+ metadata can co-exist with HDR10 static metadata that makes HDR10+ content backward compatible with non-HDR10+ TVs. HDR10+ metadata is ignored by devices that do not support the format and video is played back in HDR10.

== Administration ==
HDR10+ Technologies, LLC administers the license and certification program for products that want to adopt HDR10+. HDR10+ Technologies, LLC provides the technical specifications, test specifications, and certified logo.

=== Founders ===
- Samsung Electronics Co., Ltd
- 20th Century Fox (now 20th Century Studios)
- Panasonic Corporation

=== Authorized test centers ===
Certification of products is done through authorized test centers. The following are a list of HDR10+ authorized test centers:

- Allion – Japan
- Allion Shenzhen – China
- Allion Taipei – Taiwan
- BluFocus – United States
- Kwangsung – South Korea
- SGS-CSTC Standards Technical Services Co. Ltd – China
- Shenzhen CESI Information Technology Co., Ltd – China
- TIRT – China
- TTA – South Korea

== Adoption ==
=== Adopters ===
- Google
- Amazon
- Evertz AV
- Panasonic Corporation
- Telechips
- Amlogic (Shanghai) Co., Ltd.
- Extron Electronics
- Parade Technologies, Inc.
- Teledyne LeCroy
- Andy Fiord Production Company
- FF Pictures GmbH
- Pixelogic Media Partners LLC
- TFI Digital Media
- Arcelik
- Fidelity in Motion
- Pixelworks, Inc.
- Top Victory Electronics -TPV
- Arm Limited
- Giant Interactive
- Pixtree, Inc.
- Toshiba Visual Solutions Corp
- Astro Design
- Grass Valley K.K.
- Turbine Medien GmbH
- ATEME SA
- Guangdong Oppo Mobile
- Qualcomm
- 20th Century Studios Inc.
- FRAMES PER FILM
- Audio Partnership PLC
- Interra Systems
- Rakuten TV
- Unigraf Oy
- Beijing Xiaomi Mobile Software
- Inventory Films
- Realme Chongqing Mobile
- US Screen Corp
- Blackmagic Design Technology Pte Ltd
- Ivi.ru LLC
- Realtek Semiconductor Corp.
- V-Silicon Inc.
- Blackshark Technologies
- JVCKENWOOD Corp
- Rohde & Schwarz GmbH & Co. KG
- Venera Technologies
- Broadcom
- Loewe Technologies GmbH
- Samsung Research America
- VeriSilicon, Inc
- Capella Systems
- Lussier
- Shenzhen SDMC Technology Co., Ltd
- Vestel Elektronik
- Chrontel
- MediaArea.net
- Shenzhen TCL New Technolog Co., Ltd.
- Vicom
- Colorfront
- Media Tek Inc.
- Shenzhen Zidoo Technology Co., Ltd.
- VideoQ
- Crestron Electronics
- MegaChips Technology America
- Shout! Factory LLC
- Visible Light Digital Inc Archived 2019-09-05 at the Wayback Machine
- Dalet UK Ltd.
- Megogo LLC
- Sirius Pixels
- Vivo Mobile Communications
- Deluxe Entertainment Services Group
- MTI Film
- Socionext, Inc.
- Vizio
- Digital Vision
- Novatek Microelectronics Corp.
- Spears & Munsil
- Warner Bros. Entertainment
- DTS, Inc.
- Omnitek
- Spin Digital Video Technologies GmbH
- Weka Media Publishing
- Encoding.com Inc.
- OnePlus Technology (Shenzhen) Co., Ltd
- Synaptics, Inc.
- Xi'an NovaStar Tech Co., Ltd.
- Enteractive GmbH
- Onkyo Corporation
- T1 Technologies
- Yamzz IP BV
- EON 247, A Public Benefit Corporation
- Oppo Digital, Inc.
- Tatung Technology Inc.
- Shenzhen Amoonsky Technology Co., LTD.

=== HDR10+ certified products ===
Certified product categories include:

- Ultra-High Definition displays
- Ultra HD Blu-ray disc players
- Systems-on-chip (SoC)
- Set-top boxes
- A/V receivers
- Streaming applications
- Mobile devices
- In-flight entertainment systems
