= Video calibration software =

Video calibration software is software used to improve the quality of commercial video reproduction.

Organizations such as the Society for Motion Picture and Television Engineers (SMPTE), the Commission Internationale de l'Eclairage (CIE), the Advanced Television Systems Committee (ATSC), and the International Telecommunication Union (ITU) have established standards for the proper transmission and display of video signals. Commercially available televisions do not generally conform to those standards, but often possess controls that allow those with the proper training and equipment to greatly improve the quality of image reproduction.

The Imaging Science Foundation (ISF) has promoted the value of good video reproduction and certifies candidates as ISF-trained calibrators in the techniques necessary to bring video displays in line with established broadcast, DVD, and Blu-ray standards. ISF calibrators rely upon three tools to accomplish this goal:

- Color analyzer: hardware that connects to a computer that measures the light and color produced by the display device.
- Test patterns: standard video test patterns that test the display’s ability to perform as expected.
- Video calibration software: software that receives the signals from the color analyzer and displays the data in numerical format which is interpreted in a human interface in the form of real-time charts and graphs. Calibrators use this information to guide decisions about how to properly adjust the displays.

Though the ISF popularized the value of professional video calibration, in recent years the equipment necessary to carry out the necessary tasks has become inexpensive enough that enthusiasts and prosumers have been empowered to calibrate their own displays.

There are three products that are currently available in a price range that consumers can afford.

- Color HCFR
- ChromaPure
- CalMan

Color HCFR is a freeware program developed by enthusiasts in France. It was released in 2006. ChromaPure is a commercial product that was released in 2009. It was developed by a partnership between an American ISF calibrator and a programmer. CalMAN is a commercial product that was originally released as a Microsoft Excel-based program in 2002. In 2007 it was redesigned as a standalone Windows program based around a new Calibration Optimization and Reporting Environment (CORE) engine. Written exclusively using 64-bit double-precision floating point math, the CORE engine outperforms even popular spreadsheet applications for calculation accuracy because it never has to drop to single-precision or integer operations for convenience or speed purposes. It was developed by a partnership between an American video engineer and a programmer with a goal to make video calibration increasingly accessible and more powerful.

All video calibration software interfaces with a color analyzer that reads the luminance and the color from a commercial display. The software then interprets that data, usually in xyY format, and then displays it on a laptop PC. That data allows a calibrator to correct any errors in

- White point
- Gamma
- Color gamut
- Peak output (the display's output at 100% stimulus)
- Black level
