= Rec. 2100 =

ITU-R recommendation

ITU-R Recommendation BT.2100, more commonly known by the abbreviations Rec. 2100 or BT.2100, introduced high-dynamic-range television (HDR-TV) by recommending the use of the perceptual quantizer (PQ [SMPTE ST 2084]) or hybrid log–gamma (HLG) transfer functions instead of the traditional "gamma" previously used for SDR-TV.

It defines various aspects of HDR-TV such as display resolution (HDTV and UHDTV), frame rate, chroma subsampling, bit depth, color space, color primaries, white point, and transfer function. It was posted on the International Telecommunication Union (ITU) website on July 4, 2016. Rec. 2100 uses a wide color gamut (WCG) which is the same as Rec. 2020's.

== Technical details ==
=== Transfer functions ===
Rec. 2100 defines two sets of HDR transfer functions which are perceptual quantization (PQ) and hybrid log-gamma (HLG). HLG is supported in Rec. 2100 with a nominal peak luminance of 1,000 cd/m^{2} and a system gamma value that can be adjusted depending on background luminance. For a reference viewing environment the peak luminance of display should be 1000 cd/m^{2} or more for small area highlights and the black level should be 0.005 cd/m^{2} or less. The surround light should be 5 cd/m^{2} and be neutral grey at standard illuminant D_{65}.

Within each set, the documented transfer functions include an:

- electro-optical transfer function (EOTF) which maps the non-linear signal value into display light
- opto-optical transfer function (OOTF) which maps relative scene linear light to display linear light
- opto-electronic transfer function (OETF) which maps relative scene linear light into the non-linear signal value

=== System colorimetry ===
CIE 1931 chromaticity diagram showing the Rec. 2100 (HDR-TV) color space in the triangle and the location of the primary colors. Rec. 2100 uses Illuminant D65 for the white point.

Rec. 2100 uses the same color primaries as Rec. 2020 which is a Wide Color Gamut.

RGB color space parameters
Color space	White point		Primary colors					
Color space	x_{W}	y_{W}	x_{R}	y_{R}	x_{G}	y_{G}	x_{B}	y_{B}
ITU-R BT.2100	0.3127	0.3290	0.708	0.292	0.170	0.797	0.131	0.046

=== Resolution ===
Rec. 2100 specifies three resolutions of 1920 × 1080 ("Full HD"), 3840 × 2160 ("4K UHD"), and 7680 × 4320 ("8K UHD"). These resolutions have an aspect ratio of 16:9 and use square pixels.

=== Frame rate ===
Rec. 2100 specifies the following frame rates: 120, 119.88, 100, 60, 59.94, 50, 30, 29.97, 25, 24 and 23.976 Hz. Only progressive scan frame rates are allowed.

=== Digital representation ===
Rec. 2100 specifies a bit depth of either 10-bits per sample or 12-bits per sample, with either narrow range or full range color values. A future-use and intermediate linear RGB format using IEEE 16 bit floating point representation for each channel is also specified. For narrow range color, 10-bit per sample signals use video levels where the black level is defined as 64, achromatic gray level as 512 and the nominal peak as 940 in RGB, Y, and I encoding and 960 in Cb/Cr, and Ct/Cp component encoding. 12-bit per sample signals define 256 as the black level, 2048 as the gray level and the nominal peak is 3760 in RGB, Y, and I component encoding and 3840 in Cb/Cr, and Ct/Cp component encoding. Narrow range signals may extend below black or above peak white (super-black and super-white respectively), but must always be clipped to the signal range of 4-1019 for 10-bit signals or 16-4079 for 12-bit signals.

=== Signal formats ===
Rec. 2100 specifies the use of RGB, YCbCr, and ICtCp. ICtCp provides an improved color representation that is designed for high dynamic range (HDR) and wide color gamut signals (WCG).

=== Luma coefficients ===
Rec. 2100 allows for RGB, YCbCr, and ICtCp signal formats with 4:4:4, 4:2:2, and 4:2:0 chroma subsampling. Rec. 2100 specifies that if a luma (Y') signal is made it uses the same matrix coefficients as Rec. 2020: 0.2627 for red, 0.678 for green, and 0.0593 for blue (derived from BT.2020 primaries and white point).

=== Chroma sample location ===
Before Rec. BT.2020 the chroma sample location that was in use was center left. But in H.265 (2018–02) top-left chroma siting was mandated for BT.2020-2 and BT.2100-1, that must be described in VUI (video usability information) as such. First value of VUI should be 2 for top-left chroma and 0 for center left. Blu-ray also uses top-left chroma for HDR, including for Dolby Vision.
