= On Air (streaming service) =

Concert streaming service

On Air B.V
- Industry: Streaming media, Entertainment, Music industry, Film distribution
- Genre: Concert films, Live music, Music documentary, Performing arts
- Founded: January 2019
- Headquarters: Baarn, the Netherlands; London, United Kingdom
- Services: live streaming, video production, marketing, PR, distribution and delivery
- Website: onair.events

On Air was a streaming service that specialized in live and on-demand concert performances, other forms of on-stage entertainment, and documentaries. The platform provided access to recorded entertainment from various artists and venues, delivered in up to 4K UHD with Dolby Vision and Dolby Atmos. Viewers could access content through the On Air website, as well as apps for iOS, Apple TV, Android, Android TV, and Amazon Fire TV.

On Air offered TVOD (transaction video on demand) access. The service featured performances across multiple genres, including rock, pop, classical, and electronic music.

The company had collaborated with production and distribution partners such as Mercury Studios and Spiritland Productions, among others. They worked with venues such as the Royal Albert Hall, BBC Studios, and OVO Arena Wembley.

== History and Operations ==
On Air launched during 2019, with an aim to bring accessible live streaming and distribution capabilities to artists, labels and rights holders.

The company launched its first version of the platform in 2020 with a range of genres including rap, soul, and classical, working with artists such as Skepta and Arlo Parks.

In July 2021, the company streamed Reggae Recipe, a live version of a Capital XTRA radio show focused on dancehall, afrobeats, and reggae. In September of that year, On Air's Synchron Stage Orchestra classical shows were recognised by Classic FM as one of "the best classical music and opera online streams available in 2021". During this year, On Air also collaborated with several major record labels to produce and stream live concert content for their artists, including Robert Glasper and Anne-Marie. They also were an official broadcast partner for the AIM Awards in 2021.

In 2022, On Air experienced significant growth. During this year, they released native mobile apps across iOS and Android with casting capabilities. They continued to work with major record labels, streaming predominantly rock and pop during this period, including Years & Years and 10cc.

In 2023, On Air introduced TV apps across tvOS, AndoidTV and Amazon Fire TV. In collaboration with Dolby, On Air piloted live streaming 4K UHD with Dolby Vision and Dolby Atmos, including a real-time broadcast of All Time Low and on-demand concert of Noel Gallagher's High Flying Birds. During 2023, the company introduced an offering of in-house editing and post-production services for concert shows.

In 2024 On Air substantially expanded their library of available content through a partnership with Mercury Studios offering concerts of a variety of genres and shows, including The Rolling Stones, Katy Perry, Hans Zimmer and Bob Marley, among others. In 2025, they worked with Devin Townsend on his rock-opera The Moth.

After years of internal financial turbulence, on 23/12/2025 On Air was finally declared Bankrupt

== Notable Releases ==
On Air worked on a variety of concert productions. Examples are listed below, with a full catalogue available in the table at the end of the article.

=== Original Productions ===
- Noel Gallagher's High Flying Birds – Live at Wythenshawe Park, Manchester (2023)
- All Time Low – Tell Me I’m Alive Live at OVO Arena Wembley (2023)
- Zara Larsson – Venus Tour (2024)
- Years & Years – Night Call (2022)
- Angélique Kidjo – 40th Anniversary (2023)

=== Distributed Content ===
- YOSHIKI – Requiem Classical World Tour (2023) (Wowow)
- The Who – Live At The Isle Of Wight Festival 1970 (2024) (Mercury Studios)
- The Rolling Stones – Sticky Fingers Live At The Fonda (2024) (Mercury Studios)
- The SAS Band – 30th Anniversary Special (2024)

== Services ==
- Event production, both on-site and remote, for live streaming, show editing and post-production including content quality upgrading such as upscaling, color grading (various formats including Dolby Vision) and audio mixing (various formats including Dolby Atmos).
- Provides content distribution and monetisation services through web, mobile and TV apps where users can access content on TVOD basis for live and pre-recorded content.
- Marketing services for digital marketing campaigns, aiming for high visibility and awareness of artist shows across social media platforms and various PR outlets.
- On Air also provides brand partnership services for artists to build relationships with brands through music content.

== Original Productions ==
On Air produced a number of original shows, in addition to distributing content from other artists and labels. These productions were filmed, produced, edited, and marketed in-house. All shows produced by On Air since December 2020 were either in 4K UHD or 8K with Dolby Vision and Dolby Atmos.

Full list of On Air productions
Year	Title	Length	Format
2020	Justin Mylo Live DJ Set	1h 9m	HD, Stereo
2020	Sam Feldt Live DJ Set	1h 35m	HD, Stereo
2020	Julian Jordan Live DJ Set	1h 5m	HD, Stereo
2020	Beethoven's 9th Symphony	1hr 16m	8K, Dolby Vision, Dolby Atmos
2021	Wolfgang Amadeus Mozart 'Symphony No. 41 in C Major'	33m	4K UHD, Dolby Vision, Dolby Atmos
2021	Johannes Brahms' 'Symphony No. 4 in E Minor'	47m	4K UHD, Dolby Vision, Dolby Atmos
2021	Antonin Dvorak's 'Symphony No. 9 in E Minor'	48m	4K UHD, Dolby Vision, Dolby Atmos
2020	Arlo Parks Live At The Steel Yard	55m	HD, Stereo
2020	Celebrate Tina by Berget Lewis	1h 1m	HD, Stereo
2020	Skepta Live At The Steel Yard	1h 17m	HD, Stereo
2021	Reggae Recipe Live!	1h 10m	4K UHD, Dolby Vision, Dolby Atmos
2021	Glasper / Martin Present Dinner Party	52m	4K UHD, Dolby Vision, Dolby Atmos
2021	Robert Glasper Electric Trio	52m	4K UHD, Dolby Vision, Dolby Atmos
2021	Anne-Marie: Therapy - The Live Experience	1h 27m	4K UHD, Dolby Vision, Dolby Atmos
2021	HRVY: Behind Closed Doors	1h	4K UHD, Dolby Vision, Dolby Atmos
2022	Kurupt FM The Greatest Hits Tour	1h 33m	4K UHD, Dolby Vision, Dolby Atmos
2022	Years & Years: Night Call	1h 20m	4K UHD, Dolby Vision, Dolby Atmos
2022	UB40 feat. Ali Campbell in Memory of Astro	1h 41m	4K UHD, Dolby Vision, Dolby Atmos
2022	Igor Stravinsky's 'The Firebird' by the Royal Philharmonic Orchestra	22m	4K UHD, Dolby Vision, Dolby Atmos
2022	Igor Stravinsky's 'The Rite of Spring' by the Royal Philharmonic Orchestra	36m	4K UHD, Dolby Vision, Dolby Atmos
2022	Igor Stravinsky's 'Petrushka' by the Royal Philharmonic Orchestra	36m	4K UHD, Dolby Vision, Dolby Atmos
2022	Becky Hill presents YOU / ME / US	1h 5m	4K UHD, Dolby Vision, Dolby Atmos
2023	Angélique Kidjo '40th Anniversary'	1h 51m	4K UHD, Dolby Vision, Dolby Atmos
2023	All Time Low: Tell Me I'm Alive	1h 48m	4K UHD, Dolby Vision, Dolby Atmos
2023	Noel Gallagher's High Flying Birds 'Live at Wythenshawe Park, Manchester'	1h 27m	4K UHD, Dolby Vision, Dolby Atmos
2024	Zara Larsson 'Venus Tour'	1h 15m	4K UHD, Dolby Vision, Dolby Atmos
2024	Bombay Bicycle Club 'Live at Alexandra Palace Park'	1h 30m	4K UHD, Dolby Vision, Dolby Atmos
2024	All Time Low 'Forever: Live From Maryland'	2h 13m	4K UHD, Dolby Vision, Dolby Atmos
2025	Devin Townsend 'The Moth'	2h 5m	4K UHD, Stereo

== Awards and nominations ==
- Best Digital Customer Experience, International Customer Experience Awards (2022) – Silver
- Entertainment, Websites and Mobile Sites, Webby Awards (2024) – Honoree
- Best Streaming Service, Apps & Software, Webby Awards (2025) – Nominated (result pending)
