= Standard-dynamic-range video =

Video with a dynamic range that was standard before high-dynamic-range video

Standard-dynamic-range video (SDR video) is a video technology which represents light intensity based on the brightness, contrast and color characteristics and limitations of a cathode ray tube (CRT) display. SDR video is able to represent a video or picture's colors with a maximum luminance around 100 cd/m^{2}, a black level around 0.1 cd/m^{2} and Rec.709 / sRGB color gamut. It uses the gamma curve as its electro-optical transfer function.

The first CRT television sets were manufactured in 1934 and the first color CRT television sets were manufactured in 1954. The term "standard-dynamic-range video" was adopted to distinguish SDR video from high-dynamic-range video (HDR video), a new technology that was developed in the 2010s to overcome SDR's limits.

== Technical details ==
=== Transfer function ===
Conventional gamma curves:

- Opto-electronic transfer function (OETF):
  - Rec. 601 (analog video signals in SD-TV digital video form)
  - Rec. 709 (HD-TV)
  - Rec. 2020 (UHD-TV)
  - sRGB
- Electro-optical transfer function (EOTF):
  - ITU-R BT.1886 (SDR-TV)
  - sRGB (monitors, printers, World Wide Web)

The linear part of the conventional gamma curve was used to limit camera noise in low light video but is no longer needed with high dynamic range (HDR) cameras. An example of a conventional gamma curve would be Rec. 601:

$$E=\begin{cases}
4.500L & L < 0.018\\
1.099 L^{0.45} - 0.099 & L \ge 0.018
\end{cases}$$

ITU-R Recommendation BT.1886 describe the reference EOTF of SDR. It's a gamma curve representing the response of CRT to video signal. It has been published by ITU in 2011.

A transfer function that is closer to Weber's law allows for a larger dynamic range, at the same bit depth, than a conventional gamma curve. HDR standards such as hybrid log–gamma (HLG) and SMPTE ST 2084 allow for a larger dynamic range by using a different transfer function. HLG is compatible with SDR displays.

=== Color gamut ===
Rec. 709 gamut

In some cases the term SDR is also used with a meaning including the standard color gamut (i.e. Rec. 709 / sRGB color primaries). HDR uses wide color gamut (WCG) such as Rec. 2020 or DCI-P3 color primaries.

=== Dynamic range ===
The dynamic range that can be perceived by the human eye in a single image is around 14 stops. SDR video with a conventional gamma curve and a bit depth of 8-bits per sample has a dynamic range of about 6 stops, assuming a luminance quantisation threshold of 5% is used. A threshold of 5% is used in the paper (instead of the standard 2% threshold) to allow for the typical display being dimmer than ideal. Professional SDR video with a bit depth of 10-bits per sample has a dynamic range of about 10 stops.

== Displaying SDR video on modern displays ==
While conventional gamma curves are useful for low light and are compatible with CRT displays, they can only represent a limited dynamic range. Standards require SDR to be viewed on a display with the same characteristics as a CRT (i.e. 100 nits peak brightness, gamma curve, Rec. 709 color primaries). However, current displays are often far more capable than CRT's limits. On such displays, higher brightness and wider color gamut can be displayed by adjusting and trying to enhance the SDR picture. HDR is however required for the creative intents to be preserved.
