= ITU-R BT.1886 =

Standard for video display gamma

ITU-R BT.1886 is the reference transformation to convert a picture or video signal into the linear light output (EOTF) for the display of SDR-TV. It is a gamma 2.4 transfer function (a power law with a 2.4 exponent) considered as a satisfactory approximation of the response characteristic of CRT to electrical signal. It has been standardized by ITU in March 2011. It is used for Rec. 709 (HD-TV) and Rec. 2020 (UHD-TV).

== Definition ==
BT.1886 EOTF is as follows:

$L = a (\max[(V+b),0])^{\gamma}$where

- $L$ is the screen luminance, in cd/m^{2}.
- $V$ is the input video signal level, in the range $\left[0, 1 \right]$.
- $\gamma$ is the exponent of the power function and equal to 2.4
- $a = ({L_W}^{1/\gamma} - {L_B}^{1/\gamma})^{\gamma}$ is the variable for user gain (legacy “contrast” control)
- $b = \frac {{L_B}^{1/\gamma}} {{L_W}^{1/\gamma} - {L_B}^{1/\gamma}}$ is the variable for user black level lift (legacy “brightness” control)
- $L_W$ is the screen luminance for white, in cd/m^{2}.
- $L_B$ is the screen luminance for black, in cd/m^{2}.

According to ITU, for a better match, $L_B$ can be set to 0.1 for moderate black level settings (e.g. 0.1 cd/m^{2}) or to 0 for lower black levels (e.g. 0.01 cd/m^{2}).

An alternative EOTF has also been provided by ITU for the cases a more precise match of CRT characteristics is required.

== See also ==
- Gamma correction
- Transfer functions in imaging
