= Rec. 2020 =

ITU-R recommendation defining UHDTV

- CIE 1931 chromaticity diagram showing the Rec. 2020 (UHDTV) color space in the triangle and the location of the primary colors. Rec. 2020 uses Illuminant D65 for the white point.
- Status: Approved
- First published: August 23, 2012; 14 years ago
- Latest version: BT.2020-2; October 14, 2015; 10 years ago
- Authors: ITU-R
- Base standards: Rec. 2020, BT.2020
- Domain: Digital image processing
- Website: www.itu.int/rec/R-REC-BT.2020/

ITU-R Recommendation BT.2020, more commonly known by the abbreviations Rec. 2020 or BT.2020, defines various aspects of ultra-high-definition television (UHDTV) with standard dynamic range (SDR) and wide color gamut (WCG), including picture resolutions, frame rates with progressive scan, bit depths, color primaries, RGB and luma-chroma color representations, chroma subsamplings, and an opto-electronic transfer function. The first version of Rec. 2020 was posted on the International Telecommunication Union (ITU) website on August 23, 2012, and two further editions have been published since then.

Rec. 2020 is extended for high-dynamic-range (HDR) by Rec. 2100, which uses the same color primaries as Rec. 2020.

== Technical details ==
=== Resolution ===
Rec. 2020 defines two standard image formats of 3840 × 2160 ("4K") and 7680 × 4320 ("8K"). These both have an aspect ratio of 16:9 and use square pixels.

=== Frame rate ===
Rec. 2020 specifies these frame rates: 120p, 119.88p, 100p, 60p, 59.94p, 50p, 30p, 29.97p, 25p, 24p, 23.976p. Only progressive scan frame rates are allowed.

=== Digital representation ===
Rec. 2020 defines a bit depth of either 10 bits per sample or 12 bits per sample.

10 bits per sample Rec. 2020 uses video levels where the black level is defined as code 64 and the nominal peak is defined as code 940. Codes 0–3 and 1,020–1,023 are used for the timing reference. Codes 4 through 63 provide video data below the black level while codes 941 through 1,019 provide video data above the nominal peak.

12 bits per sample Rec. 2020 uses video levels where the black level is defined as code 256 and the nominal peak is defined as code 3760. Codes 0–15 and 4,080–4,095 are used for the timing reference. Codes 16 through 255 provide video data below the black level while codes 3,761 through 4,079 provide video data above the nominal peak.

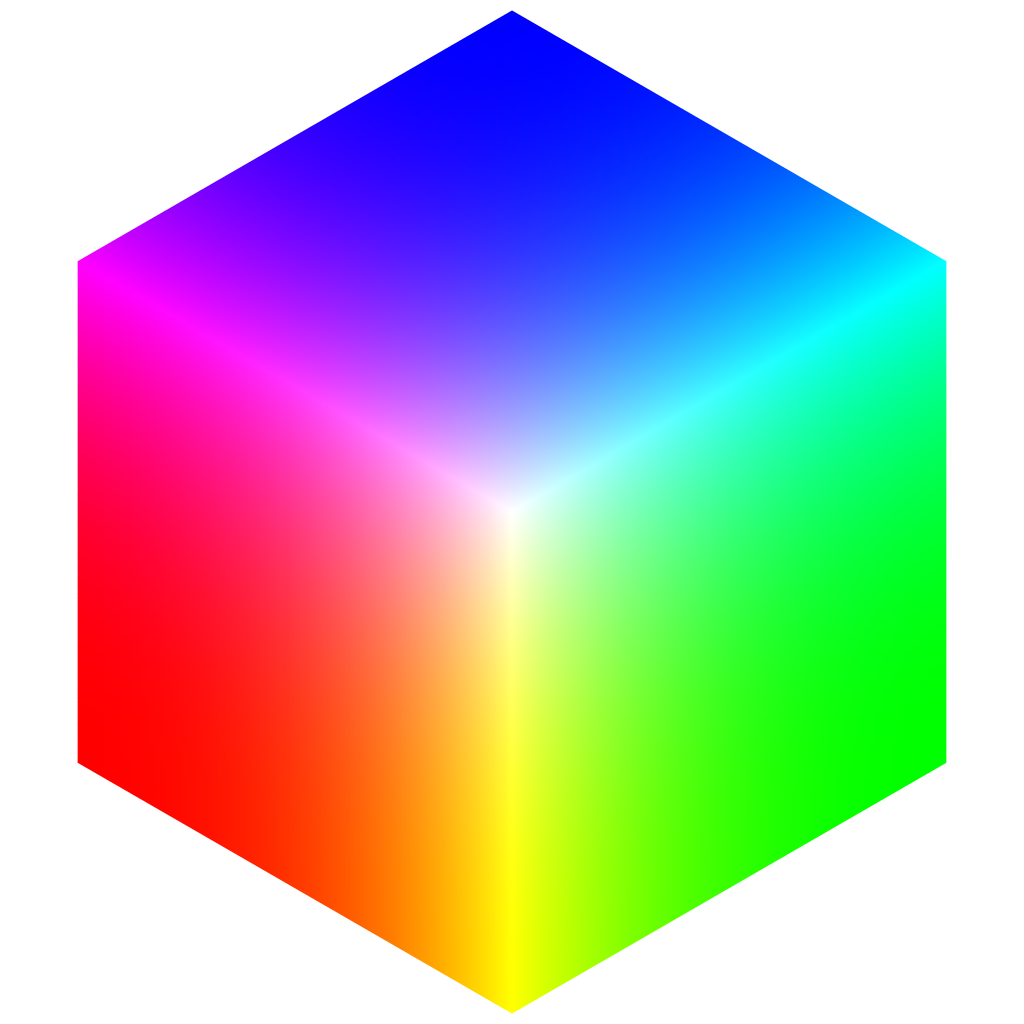
BT.2020 RGB color cube (image encoded with an ICC profile)

=== System colorimetry ===
RGB color space parameters
Color space	White point		CCT	Primary colors (CIE 1931 xy)					
Color space	x_{W}	y_{W}	k_{W}	x_{R}	y_{R}	x_{G}	y_{G}	x_{B}	y_{B}
ITU-R BT.2020	0.3127	0.3290	6500 (D65)	0.708	0.292	0.170	0.797	0.131	0.046

The Rec. 2020 (UHDTV/UHD-1/UHD-2) color space can reproduce colors that cannot be shown with the Rec. 709 (HDTV) color space. The RGB primaries used by Rec. 2020 are equivalent to monochromatic light sources on the CIE 1931 spectral locus. The wavelength of the Rec. 2020 primary colors is 630 nm for the red primary color, 532 nm for the green primary color, and 467 nm for the blue primary color. In coverage of the CIE 1931 color space, the Rec. 2020 color space covers 75.8%, the DCI-P3 digital cinema color space covers 53.6%, the Adobe RGB color space covers 52.1%, and the Rec. 709 color space covers 35.9%.

During the development of the Rec. 2020 color space it was decided that it would use real colors, instead of imaginary colors, so that it would be possible to show the Rec. 2020 color space on a display without the need for conversion circuitry. Since a larger color space increases the difference between colors, an increase of 1 bit per sample is needed for Rec. 2020 to equal or exceed the color precision of Rec. 709.

The NHK measured contrast sensitivity for the Rec. 2020 color space using Barten's equation which had previously been used to determine the bit depth for digital cinema. 11 bits per sample for the Rec. 2020 color space is below the visual modulation threshold, the ability to discern a one-value difference in luminance, for the entire luminance range. The NHK is planning for their UHDTV system, Super Hi-Vision, to use 12 bits per sample RGB.

=== Transfer characteristics ===
Rec. 2020 defines a nonlinear transfer function for gamma correction that is the same nonlinear transfer function that is used by Rec. 709, except that its parameters are (for 12 bit only) given with higher precision:

$$E^\prime=\begin{cases}
4.5E & 0 \le E < \beta\,\!\\
\alpha\,\!E^{0.45} - (\alpha\,\! - 1) & \beta\,\! \le E \le 1
\end{cases}$$

- where E is the signal proportional to camera-input light intensity and E′ is the corresponding nonlinear signal
- where α = 1 + 5.5 * β ≈ 1.09929682680944 and β ≈ 0.018053968510807 (values chosen to achieve a continuous function with a continuous first derivative)

The standard says that for practical purposes, the following values of α and β can be used:

- α = 1.099 and β = 0.018 for 10 bits per sample system (the values given in Rec. 709)
- α = 1.0993 and β = 0.0181 for 12 bits per sample system

While the Rec. 2020 transfer function can be used for encoding, it is expected that most productions will use a reference monitor that has an appearance of using equivalent of gamma 2.4 transfer function as defined in ITU-R BT.1886 and that the reference monitor will be evaluated under viewing conditions as defined in Rec. ITU-R BT.2035.

=== RGB and luma-chroma formats ===
Rec. 2020 allows for RGB and luma-chroma signal formats with 4:4:4 full-resolution sampling and luma-chroma signal formats with 4:2:2 and 4:2:0 chroma subsampling. It supports two types of luma-chroma signals, called YCbCr and YcCbcCrc.

YCbCr may be used when the top priority is compatibility with existing SDTV and HDTV operating practices. The luma (Y′) signal for YCbCr is calculated as the weighted average Y′ = K_{R}⋅R′ + K_{G}⋅G′ + K_{B}⋅B′, using the gamma-corrected RGB values (denoted R′G′B′) and the weighting coefficients K_{R} = 0.2627, K_{G} = 1−K_{R}−K_{B} = 0.678, and K_{B} = 0.0593. As in similar schemes, the chroma components in YCbCr are calculated as C′_{B} = 0.5⋅(B′−Y′)/(1−K_{B}) = (B'−Y′)/1.8814 and C′_{R} = 0.5⋅(R′−Y′)/(1−K_{R}) = (R′−Y′)/1.4746, and for digital representation the Y′, C′_{B}, and C′_{R} signals are scaled, offset by constants, and rounded to integers.

The YcCbcCrc scheme is a "constant luminance" luma-chroma representation. YcCbcCrc may be used when the top priority is the most accurate retention of luminance information. The luma component in YcCbcCrc is calculated using the same coefficient values as for YCbCr, but it is calculated from linear RGB and then gamma corrected, rather than being calculated from gamma-corrected R′G′B′ and is done as follows: Y′ = (K_{R}⋅R + K_{G}⋅G + K_{B}⋅B)′. The chroma components in YcCbcCrc are calculated from the Y′, B′, and R′ signals with equations that depend on the range of values of B′−Y′ and R′−Y′.

=== Color management ===
Just like standard definition content that uses SMPTE C or NTSC 1953, BT.2020 primaries should be color managed to primaries of display. That is different from changing YCbCr matrix. HD content is color managed to BT.709 primaries on linear values. BT.2020 and BT.2100 are usually color managed to P3-D65. The reference color bars for BT.2020 are ARIB STD-B66.

== Implementations ==
The Rec. 2020 color space is supported by H.264/MPEG-4 AVC and H.265/High Efficiency Video Coding (HEVC). The Main 10 profile in HEVC was added based on proposal JCTVC-K0109 which proposed that a 10-bit profile be added to HEVC for consumer applications. The proposal stated that this was to allow for improved video quality and to support the Rec. 2020 color space that will be used by UHDTV.

=== 2013 ===
On September 4, 2013, The HDMI forum announced version 2.0 of the HDMI specification (also known as HDMI 2.0), which supports the Rec. 2020 color space.

On September 11, 2013, ViXS Systems announced the XCode 6400 SoC which supports 4K resolution at 60 fps, the Main 10 profile of HEVC, and the Rec. 2020 color space.

=== 2014 ===
On May 22, 2014, Nanosys announced that using a quantum dot enhancement film (QDEF) a current LCD TV was modified so that it could cover 91% of the Rec. 2020 color space. Nanosys engineers believe that with improved LCD color filters it is possible to make a LCD that covers 97% of the Rec. 2020 color space.

On September 4, 2014, Canon Inc. released a firmware upgrade that added support for the Rec. 2020 color space to their EOS C500 and EOS C500 PL camera models and their DP-V3010 4K display.

On September 5, 2014, the Blu-ray Disc Association revealed that the future 4K Blu-ray Disc format will support 4K UHD (3840 × 2160 resolution) video at frame rates up to 60 fps. The standard will encode videos under the High Efficiency Video Coding standard. 4K Blu-ray Discs support both a higher color precision by increasing the color depth to 10 bits per color, and a greater color gamut by using the Rec. 2020 color space. The 4K Blu-ray specification allows for three disc sizes: 50 gb, 66 gb and 100 gb. Depending on the disc size and physical configuration, the data rate can reach up to 128 Mbit/s. The first Ultra HD Blu-ray titles were officially released from four studios on March 1, 2016.

On November 6, 2014, Google added support for the Rec. 2020 color space to VP9.

On November 7, 2014, DivX developers announced that DivX265 version 1.4.21 had added support for the Main 10 profile of HEVC and the Rec. 2020 color space.

On December 22, 2014, Avid Technology released an update for Media Composer that added support for 4K resolution, the Rec. 2020 color space, and a bit rate of up to 3,730 Mbit/s with the DNxHD codec.

=== 2015 ===
On January 6, 2015, the MHL Consortium announced the release of the superMHL specification which will support 8K resolution at 120 fps, 48-bit video, the Rec. 2020 color space, high dynamic range support, a 32-pin reversible superMHL connector, and power charging of up to 40 watts.

On January 7, 2015, Ateme added support for the Rec. 2020 color space to their TITAN File video platform.

On March 18, 2015, Arri announced the SXT line of Arri Alexa cameras which will support Apple ProRes recording at 4K resolution and the Rec. 2020 color space.

On April 8, 2015, Canon Inc. announced the DP-V2410 4K display and EOS C300 Mark II camera with support for the Rec. 2020 color space.

On May 26, 2015, the NHK announced a 4K LCD with a laser diode backlight that covers 98% of the Rec. 2020 color space. Using a laser allows for generating almost monochromatic light. The NHK stated that at the time it was announced this 4K LCD has the widest color gamut of any display in the world.

On June 17, 2015, Digital Projection International presented a 4K LED projector with support for the Rec. 2020 color space.

=== 2016 ===
On January 4, 2016, the UHD Alliance announced their specifications for Ultra HD Premium which includes support for the Rec. 2020 color space.

On January 27, 2016, VESA announced that DisplayPort version 1.4 will support the Rec. 2020 color space.

On April 17, 2016, Sony presented a 55 in (140 cm) 4K OLED display with the support of Rec. 2020 color space.

On April 18, 2016, the Ultra HD Forum announced industry guidelines for UHD Phase A which includes support for the Rec. 2020 color space.

=== 2017 ===
At SID display week 2017, AUO displayed a 5" foldable 720p HD AMOLED display able to display 95% of the Rec. 2020 colorspace. Although 720p is not specified by Rec. 2020, the color space coverage is of note.

The Ultra HD Forum guidelines for UHD Phase A include support for SDR formats with 10 bits of color bit depth based on both Rec. 709 and Rec. 2020 color gamuts and also both the HDR10 and HLG formats of Rec. 2100, which are supposed to start by 2017.

=== 2018 ===
At SID display week 2018, various companies showcased displays that are able to cover over 90% of the Rec. 2020 color space. JDI showcased an improvement of their 17.3" LCD 8k broadcast monitor that is powered by an RGB laser backlight system. This allows the display to reproduce 97% of the Rec. 2020 color space.

=== Web browsers ===
Rec. 2020 colors are supported in CSS Color Level 4 on Safari since 2022 (version 15.1), Firefox since 2023 (version 113), and Google Chrome since 2023 (version 111) browsers.

Rec. 2020 primaries using CSS 4
	sRGB	Rec. 2020
Red		
Green		
Blue		

== Rec. 2100 ==
Rec. 2100 is an ITU-R Recommendation released in July 2016 that defines high dynamic range (HDR) formats for both HDTV 1080p and 4K/8K UHDTV resolutions. These formats use the same color primaries as Rec. 2020, but with different transfer functions for HDR use. Rec. 2100 does not support the YcCbcCrc scheme of Rec. 2020.

== See also ==
- Rec. 601 – ITU-R Recommendation for SDTV
- Rec. 709
