= Transfer functions in imaging =

Relationship between electrical signal and light

Images and videos use specific transfer functions to describe the relationship between electrical signal, scene light and displayed light.

== Definition ==
The opto-electronic transfer function (OETF) is the transfer function having the scene light as input and converting into the picture or video signal as output. This is typically done within a camera.

The electro-optical transfer function (EOTF) is the transfer function having the picture or video signal as input and converting it into the linear light output of the display. This is done within a display device.

The opto-optical transfer function (OOTF) is the transfer function having the scene light as input and the displayed light as output. The OOTF is the composition of the OETF and the EOTF and is usually non-linear.

== List of transfer functions ==
=== Linear ===
- Raw formats
- Some OETF and EOTF have an initial linear portion followed by a non-linear part (e.g. sRGB and Rec.709).

=== Gamma ===
- Rec. 601, Rec. 709 and Rec. 2020: The ITU-R recommendations BT.601, BT.709 and BT.2020 describe the reference OETF of respectively SD-TV, HD-TV and UHD-TV. They are identical OETF based on a gamma curve and used for SDR-TV.
- BT.1886: The ITU-R Recommendation BT.1886 is the reference EOTF of Standard Dynamic Range TV (SDR).
- sRGB: sRGB defines a transfer function based on a gamma curve and used for monitors, printers and the Web. sRGB is standardized as IEC 61966-2-1:1999

=== Logarithmic ===
- S-Log: Developed by Sony for their cameras.
- Canon Log: Developed by Canon for their digital cameras.
- Arri Log C: Developed by Arri for their Alexa and Amira camera systems.
- Cineon Log: Developed by Kodak for use in film scanning.

=== HDR ===
These transfer functions have been developed to allow HDR display:

- Perceptual quantizer: PQ is a transfer function developed by Dolby for HDR and allowing a luminance level of up to 10,000 cd/m^{2}. It is standardized in Rec. 2100 as well as SMPTE ST 2084.
- Hybrid log–gamma: HLG is a transfer function developed by NHK and BBC for HDR and offering some backward compatibility on SDR displays. HLG is a hybrid transfer function in which the lower half of the signal values use a gamma curve and the upper half of the signal values use a logarithmic curve. It is standardized in Rec. 2100.
