= List of color spaces and their uses =

This is a list of color spaces, grouped by the color model that is used for part of their specification.

== Models ==
Color models can be based on physics or human perception. Physical descriptions of color can be additive (describes mixing of light, RGB) or subtractive (describes mixing of pigment or removal of light, CMYK). Descriptions based on human perception are based on some experimental results on humans. Some models and their variants are employed in parts of the color spaces listed below.

Additive color mixing

Subtractive color mixing

== Human perception ==
Instead of being based on color mixture, they are based on human experience or phenomenology.

=== CIE 1931 XYZ ===
CIE 1931 XYZ was the first attempt to produce a color space based on measurements of human color perception and the basis for almost all other color spaces.

=== CIEUVW ===
Measurements over a larger field of view than the "CIE 1931 XYZ" color space which produces slightly different results.

=== Uniform color spaces ===
Uniform color spaces (UCSs) are built such that the same geometrical distance anywhere in the color space reflects the same amount of perceived color difference. There have been many attempts at building such a color space.

As human vision has three components, the space is necessarily 3D; it is generally assigned such that one is the lightness and the other two the chroma. A uniform color space is useful for a wide range of tasks. It can be used to calculate color difference or to pick colors in a visually harmonious way, for example.

==== CIELUV ====
A modification of "CIE 1931 XYZ" to display color differences more conveniently. The CIELUV space is useful for additive mixtures of lights, due to its linear addition properties (human hue perception does not respect light addition, however).

==== CIELAB ====
CIELAB produces a color space that is more perceptually linear than other color spaces. Perceptually linear means that a change of the same amount in a color value should produce a change of about the same visual importance. CIELAB has almost entirely replaced the earlier alternative Lab color space called “Hunter Lab”. This space is commonly used for surface colors, but not for mixtures of (transmitted) light.

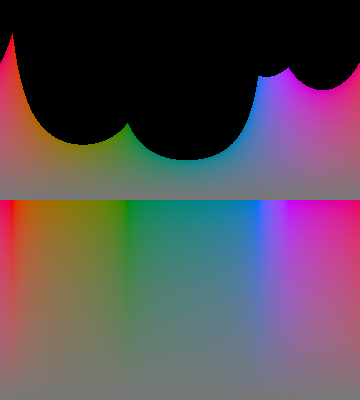
Possible colors in CIELUV LCh (top) and HSLuv (bottom)

==== HSLuv ====
HSLuv preserves the lightness and hue components of CIELUV LCh and stretches its chroma so that every color has the same range, defined as a percentage.

==== Newer models ====
CIELAB and CIELUV are soon recognized to be insufficient to explain the entire range of color phenomena. A range of increasingly complex color appearance models appeared to model the behavior of human vision under different viewing conditions, but ended up less used due to the added inputs required and overall algorithmic complexity.

In addition, the performance of the 1976 color spaces under different viewing conditions is not their only problem. Even under the default reference viewing condition, CIELAB is known to poorly work in blue hues. For a standard dynamic range and a fixed viewing condition, it turns out that CIELAB's simple structure suffices as long as better coefficients are used.

The IPT color space of 1998 uses new data about hue to greatly improve on CIELAB's non-constant lines of hue, although it still leaves much to be desired in its prediction of colorfulness and lightness. Oklab uses IPT data for hue and a modern CAM (CAM16) to generate lightness and colorfulness data, resulting in an improved fit over human perception under the same structure.

== RGB primaries ==
RGB (red, green, blue) describes the chromaticity component of a given color, when excluding luminance. RGB itself is not a color space, it is a color model. There are many different color spaces that employ this color model to describe their chromaticities because the R/G/B chromaticities are one facet for reproducing color in CRT & LED displays.

=== sRGB ===
The sRGB color space (standard red, green, blue) was created jointly by Hewlett-Packard and Microsoft for use on the Internet. It has been endorsed by the W3C, Exif, Intel, Pantone, Corel, and many other industry players. It is also well accepted by open-source software such as the GIMP, and is used in proprietary and open graphics file formats such as SVG.

sRGB is intended as a common color space for the creation of images for viewing on the Internet and World Wide Web (WWW). The resultant color space closely approximates a Gamma correction of 2.2, the average response of a CRT display to linear voltage levels.

=== Adobe RGB ===
The Adobe RGB color space was developed by Adobe Systems in 1998. It was designed to encompass most of the colors achievable on CMYK color printers, but by using RGB primary chromaticities on a device such as the computer display. The Adobe RGB color space encompasses roughly 50% of the visible colors specified by the Lab color space, improving upon the gamut of the sRGB color space primarily in cyan-greens.

=== Adobe Wide Gamut RGB ===
The Adobe Wide Gamut RGB color space was developed by Adobe Systems as an alternative to the standard sRGB color space. It is able to store a wider range of color values than sRGB. The Wide Gamut color space is an expanded version of the Adobe RGB color space, developed in 1998. As a comparison, the Adobe Wide Gamut RGB color space encompasses 77.6% of the visible colors specified by the Lab color space, whilst the standard Adobe RGB color space covers just 50.6%.

One of the downsides to this color space is that approximately 8% of the colors representable are imaginary colors that do not exist and are not representable in any medium. This means that potential color accuracy is wasted by reserving these unnecessary colors.

=== Rec. 2100 ===
Rec. 2100 is a color space standardized by ITU and used for HDR-TV. It has a peak luminance of at least 1,000 cd/m2 (higher than the 100 cd/m2 limit of SDR and color spaces such as Rec. 709 and Rec. 2020). It uses a non-gamma transfer function (PQ or HLG) and system colorimetry (chromaticity of color primaries and white point) identical to Rec. 2020 system colorimetry.

=== Others with RGB primaries ===
- ProPhoto RGB color space
- scRGB
- DCI-P3, used primarily for digital movie projection
- SMPTE 240M / SMPTE "C", used in NTSC and MUSE analog television systems
- Rec. 601, used for SDTV
- Rec. 709, used for HDTV
- Rec. 2020, used for UHDTV
- Academy Color Encoding System (ACES)

== Lightness and Chroma ==
As human vision has lower resolution in color perception, it is more economic to separate lightness from chroma signals from an RGB input, and reduce the bandwidth needed to encode chroma. These correspond to linear methods of separating lightness from chroma signals in an RGB input using linear combination. As the input RGB values are gamma-corrected, such a separation does not truly produce lightness and two chroma signals, but a "luma" signal and two "chrominance" signals instead.

Many models use this approach to encode colors:

- Y′UV: color model found in the PAL analogue color TV standard. A color is described as a $Y'$ component (luma) and two chroma components $U$ and $V$.
- YDbDr: is the format used in SECAM, where $Y$ is the luminance and, $D_B$ and $D_R$ are the chrominance components, representing the red and blue colour differences.
- Y′IQ: is the format used in NTSC television, where $I$ stands for in-phase, while $Q$ stands for quadrature, referring to the components used in quadrature amplitude modulation.
- Y'PbPr: used in video electronics, in particular in reference to component video cables. Like YC_{B}C_{R}, it is based on gamma corrected RGB primaries; the two are numerically equivalent but YP_{B}P_{R} is designed for use in analog systems while YC_{B}C_{R} is intended for digital video.
- Y′CbCr: digital encoding of Y'PbPr suited for video and image compression and transmission formats such as MPEG and JPEG.
- Y′CoCg: uses two chroma values called chrominance orange ($C_o$) and chrominance green ($C_g$) and is supported in video and image compression designs such as H.264/MPEG-4 AVC, HEVC, VVC, JPEG XR, and Dirac. It results in faster computation, lossless conversion, and apparently better decorrelation.
- ICtCp: specified in the Rec. ITU-R BT.2100 standard, and used as a part of the color image pipeline in video and digital photography systems for high dynamic range (HDR) and wide color gamut (WCG) imagery. The $I$ ("intensity") component is a luma component that represents the brightness of the video, and $C_T$ and $C_P$ are blue-yellow (named from tritanopia) and red-green (named from protanopia) chroma components.
- xvYCC: used in the video electronics of television sets to support a gamut 1.8 times as large as that of the sRGB color space.
- sYCC: uses two chroma values which are roughly the "blueness" and "redness" of the hue. Each coordinate is represented by an integer.

== Cylindrical transformations ==
Cylindrical transformations seek to turn a color model into three components: the lightness, the colorfulness, and the hue.

=== HSV and HSL ===
HSV and HSL are transformations of Cartesian RGB primaries (usually sRGB), and their components and colorimetry are relative to the colorspace from which they are derived. HSV (hue, saturation, value), also known as HSB (hue, saturation, brightness), is often used by artists because it is often more natural to think about a color in terms of hue and saturation than in terms of additive or subtractive color components. HSL (hue, saturation, lightness or luminance), also known as HSI (hue, saturation, intensity) or HSD (hue, saturation, darkness), is quite similar to HSV, with "lightness" replacing "brightness". The difference is that a perfectly light color in HSL is pure white; but a perfectly bright color in HSV is analogous to shining a white light on a colored object. I.e. shining a bright white light on a red object causes the object to still appear red, just brighter and more intense. Shining a dim light on a red object causes the object to appear darker and less bright.

The issue with both HSV and HSL is that these approaches do not effectively separate colour into their three value components according to human perception of color. This can be seen when the saturation settings are altered — it is quite easy to notice the difference in perceptual lightness despite the "V" or "L" setting being fixed.

=== LCh: uniform color space ===
For uniform color spaces that already have a lightness component, the transformation only involves rearranging the two chroma values into colorfulness (C) and hue (h).

CIELCh_{ab} and CIELCh_{uv} are cylindrical transformations of the CIELAB and CIELUV color spaces, respectively. The cylindrical coordinates C* (chroma, relative saturation) and h° (hue angle, angle of the hue in the color wheel) are specified. The CIELAB and CIELUV coordinate L* (lightness) remains unchanged.

The newer UCS systems can also be applied to a similar transform. In fact, both IPT and Oklab/Oklch are designed for hue uniformity, a feature that is only explicitly shown after a cylindrical transformation.

== Subtractive ==
=== CMYK and CMY ===
CMYK is used in the printing process, because it describes what kinds of inks are needed to be applied so the light reflected from the substrate and through the inks produces a given color. One starts with a white substrate (canvas, page, etc.), and uses ink to subtract color from white to create an image. CMYK stores ink values for cyan, magenta, yellow and black. There are many CMYK colorspaces for different sets of inks, substrates, and press characteristics (which change the dot gain or transfer function for each ink and thus change the appearance).

== Commercial color spaces ==
- Munsell color system – early perceptually-uniform color space
- Natural Color System (NCS) – perceptual
- Pantone Matching System (PMS) – standardized color reproduction (and color list)
- Spot Matching System (SMS) - 3C (Cross-media, Colour Consistent) Colour Palettes for CMYK and Extended gamut printing, web design and television graphics.
- RAL – standardized color matching (and color list)
- Aerospace Material Specification – Standard 595A (Supersedes (US) Federal Standard 595C)
- (US) Federal Standard 595C
- British Standard Colour (BS)
- HKS – standardized color reproduction (and color list)
- HLC Colour Atlas – a free and open-source color space (and color list) based on CIELab

== Special-purpose color spaces ==
- The rg chromaticity space is used in computer vision applications, and shows the color of light (red, yellow, green, etc.), but not its intensity (dark, bright).
- LMS color space (long, medium, short), a perceptual color space based on the response functions of the cones in the retina of the eye. It is mostly used in psychophysical research.
- TSL color space is used in face and skin detection.

== Obsolete color spaces ==
Early color spaces had two components. They largely ignored blue light because the added complexity of a three-component process provided only a marginal increase in fidelity when compared to the jump from monochrome to two-component color.

- RG for early Technicolor film
- RGK for early color printing
