= SYCC =

Color space

sYCC
- IEC 61966-2-1 Default YCC encoding transformation for a standard luma-chroma-chroma colour space
- Abbreviation: sRGB
- Status: Published
- Year started: 1996
- First published: October 18, 1999; 26 years ago
- Latest version: 61966-2–1 Amend. 1; 2003
- Organization: IEC
- Committee: TC/SC: TC 100/TA 2
- Base standards: IEC 61966 Colour Measurement and Management in Multimedia Systems and Equipment
- Domain: Color space, color model
- Website: webstore.iec.ch/publication/6169

sYCC is a standard numerical encoding of colors, similar to the CIE YCbCr encoding, It uses three coordinates: a luma value $Y$, that is roughly proportional to perceived brightness of the color, and two chroma values $C_b$ and $C_r$, which are roughly the "blueness" and "redness" of the hue. Each coordinate is represented by an integer with some number $N$ of bits, which is interpreted as either unsigned (for $Y$) or signed (for $C_b$ and $C_r$).

The space is defined by Annex F of the International Electrotechnical Commission (IEC) standard 61966-2-1 Amendment 1 (2003), as a linear transformation of the non-linear sRGB color space defined by the same document.

The official conversion from sYCC to sRGB will often result in negative R, G, or B values or values greater than 1 but unlike in normal YCbCr those values are not clamped. The same for when XYZ is converted into sYCC values, at the sRGB stage negative and greater than 1 values are preserved. The sRGB transfer function is thus modified to accept negative RGB values.

== sYCC definition ==
The three unsigned integers $Y,C_b,C_r$ of an sYCC encoded color represent fractional coordinates $Y',C_b',C_r'$ according to the formulas

$$Y' = Y/M$$
$$C_b' = (C_b - Z)/M$$
$$C'_r = (C_b - Z)/M$$

where the scale factor $M = 2^N - 1$ is the maximum unsigned $N$-bit integer, and the offset $Z$ is $2^{N-1}$ (as in the usual two's complement representation of signed integers). Conversely, the encoded integer values are given by

$$Y = \mbox{round}(M Y')$$
$$C_b = \mbox{round}(Z + M C_b')$$
$$C_r = \mbox{round}(Z + M C_r')$$

with the resulting values clipped to the range $0..M$.

In particular, for $N=8$ (which is the normal bit size), one gets $M = 255$ and $Z = 128$. Thus the fractional luma $Y'$ ranges from 0 to 1, while the fractional chroma coordinates range from $-128/255\approx-0.50196...$ to $+127/255\approx+0.498039...$.

The standard specifies that these fractional values $Y',C_b',C_r'$ are related to the non-linear fractional sRGB coordinates $R',G',B'$ by a linear transformation, described by the matrix product

$$\begin{bmatrix} Y' \\ C_b' \\ C_r' \end{bmatrix}
=
\begin{bmatrix}
+0.2990 & +0.5870 & +0.1140 \\
-0.1687 & -0.3313 & +0.5000 \\
+0.5000 & -0.4187 & -0.0813
\end{bmatrix}
\begin{bmatrix} R' \\ G' \\ B' \end{bmatrix}$$

This correspondence is the same as the RGB to YCC mapping specified by the old TV standard ITU-R BT.601-5, note that the coefficients of $Y'$ here are defined still with 3 decimal places, because 4 decimal places would change legacy encoding of images (first row: Kr = 0.299 and Kg = 0.587).

The non-linear fractional sRGB coordinates $R',G',B'$ can be computed from the fractional sYCC coordinates $Y',C_b',C_r'$ by inverting the above matrix. The standard gives the approximation

$$\begin{bmatrix} R' \\ G' \\ B' \end{bmatrix}
=
\begin{bmatrix}
+1.0000 &  0.0000 & +1.4020 \\
+1.0000 & -0.3441 & -0.7141 \\
+1.0000 & +1.7720 &  0.0000
\end{bmatrix}
\begin{bmatrix} Y' \\ C_b' \\ C_r' \end{bmatrix}$$

which is expected to be accurate enough for $N=8$ bits per component. For bit sizes greater than 8, the standard recommends using a more accurate inverse. It states that the following matrix with 6 decimal digits is accurate enough for $N=16$:

$$\begin{bmatrix} R' \\ G' \\ B' \end{bmatrix}
=
\begin{bmatrix}
+1.000000 & +0.000037 & +1.401988 \\
+1.000000 & -0.344113 & -0.714104 \\
+1.000000 & +1.771978 & +0.000135
\end{bmatrix}
\begin{bmatrix} Y' \\ C_b' \\ C_r' \end{bmatrix}$$

The same standard specifies the relation between the non-linear fractional coordinates $R',G',B'$ and the CIE 1931 XYZ coordinates. The connection entails the transfer function ("gamma correction") that maps $R',G',B'$ to the linear R, G, B coordinates, and then a 3D linear transformation that relates these to the CIE $X,Y,Z$.

Since the linear transformation from sRGB to sYCC is defined in terms of non-linear (gamma-encoded) values ($R',G',B'$), rather than the linear ones ($R,G,B$), the $Y'$ component of sYCC is not the CIE Y coordinate, not even a function of it alone. That is, two colors with the same CIE Y value may have different sYCC $Y'$ values, and vice-versa.

=== Particular values ===
The integer encoded sYCC triplet $(0,0,0)$ represents the color black whereas $(255,0,0)$ is white (more precisely, the CIE illuminant D65). More generally, triplets $(Y,0,0)$, for $Y$ in 0..255, represent shades of gray.

Note that the 8-bit integer sYCC triplet $(Y,Cb,Cr)=(0,255,255)$ has fractional coordinates $(Y',Cb',Cr')\approx(0.0,0.5,0.5)$, which, according to these matrices, has fractional non-linear sRGB coordinate $G' \approx - 0.5\times(0.3341 + 0.7141) \approx -0.528$, and therefore has to be converted to XYZ to be realizable or perceivable. Similarly, the sYCC triplet $(0,0,0)$ has $R'\approx -0.701$ and $B'\approx -0.886$.
