= MacAdam ellipse =

Region of chromaticity diagram

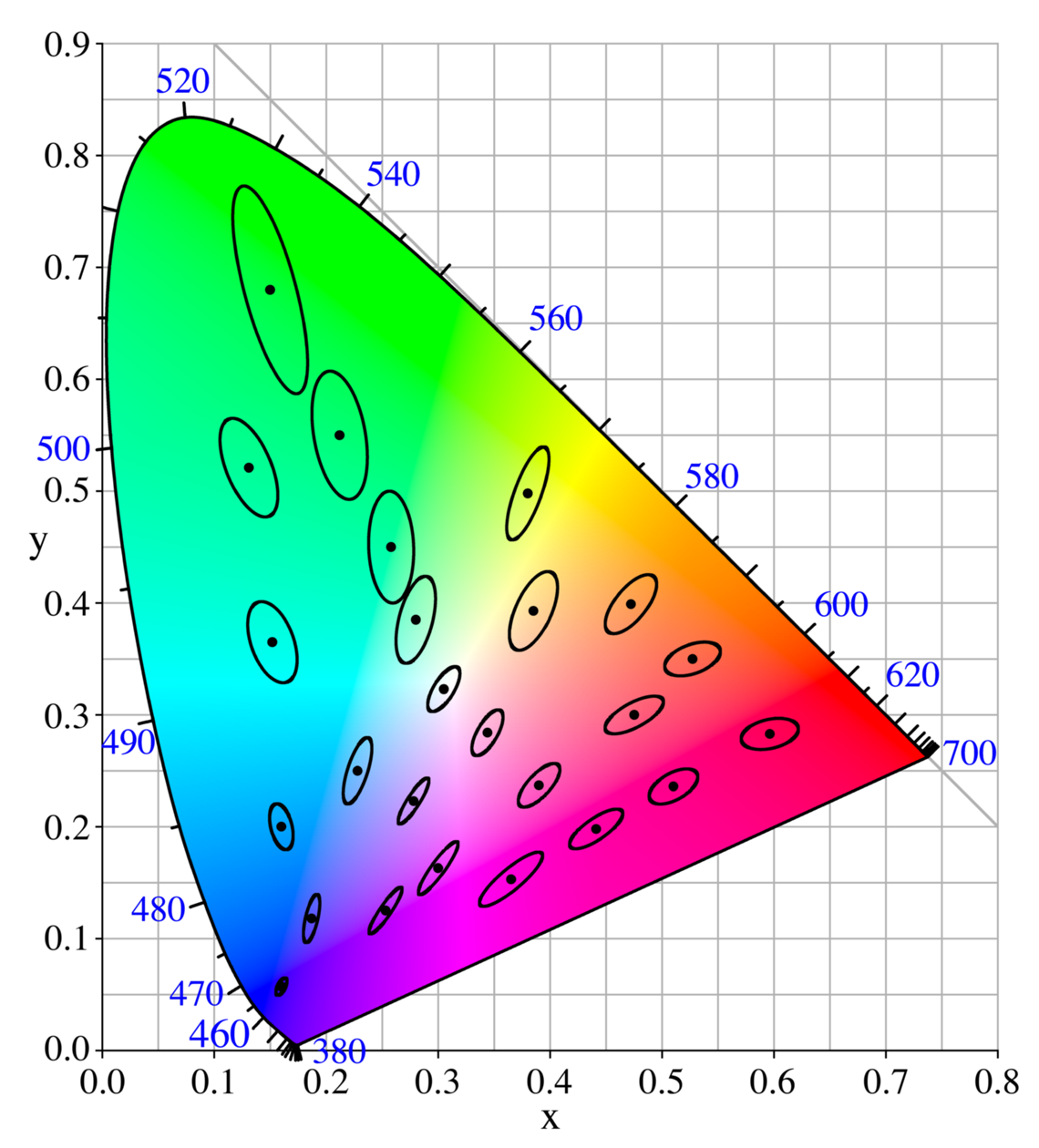
MacAdam ellipses for one of MacAdam's test participants, Perley G. Nutting (observer "PGN"), plotted on the CIE 1931 xy chromaticity diagram. The ellipses are ten times their actual size, as depicted in MacAdam's paper.

In the study of color vision, a MacAdam ellipse is roughly a region on a chromaticity diagram which contains all colors which are indistinguishable to the average human eye, from the color at the center of the ellipse. Specifically, it is the standard deviation of a number of experimental color matches to the central color. Assuming a bivariate normal distribution of these match points, a MacAdam ellipse thus contains about 39% of the color match points. A 2X MacAdam ellipse will contain about 86% of the match points, and a 3X MacAdam ellipse will contain about 99% of the match points. The just-noticeable differences of chromaticity is generally taken to be a 3X MacAdam ellipse. Standard Deviation Color Matching in LED lighting uses deviations relative to MacAdam ellipses to describe color precision of a light source.

== History ==
In the study of color perception, it is essential to develop a method of specifying a particular color such that it can be differentiated from all other colors. It has been found that three quantities are needed to specify a particular color. The relative amounts of red, green and blue in a color will serve to specify that color completely. This question was first approached by a number of researchers in the 1930s, and their results were formalized in the specification of the CIE XYZ color space.

The concept of a color space can similarly be used to determine how distant one color is from another. This particular question was considered by researchers dating back to Helmholtz and Schrödinger, and later in industrial applications, but experiments by Wright and Pitt, and David MacAdam provided much-needed empirical support.

== Procedure ==
MacAdam set up an experiment in which a trained observer viewed two different colors, at a nearly fixed luminance of about 48 cd/m^{2}. One of the colors (the "test" color) was fixed, but the other was adjustable by the observer, and the observer was asked to adjust that color until it matched the test color. This match was, of course, not perfect, since the human eye, like any other instrument, has limited accuracy. It was found by MacAdam, however, that the standard deviation of the matches made by the observer fell into an ellipse on the CIE 1931 chromaticity diagram. The measurements were made at 25 points on the chromaticity diagram, and it was found that the size and orientation of the ellipses on the diagram varied widely depending on the test color. These 25 ellipses measured by MacAdam, for a particular observer, are shown on the chromaticity diagram above.

== Extension to three dimensions ==
A more general concept is that of "discrimination ellipsoids" in the entire three-dimensional color space, which would include the ability of an observer to discriminate between two different luminances of the same color. Such measurements were carried out, among others, by Brown and MacAdam in 1949, Davidson in 1951, Brown in 1957, and by Wyszecki and Fielder in 1971. It was found that the discrimination ellipsoids yielded relatively unchanging discrimination ellipses in chromaticity space for luminances between 3 and 30 cd/m^{2}.

== Eccentricity dependency ==
The original experiment carried out by MacAdam limited the field of view to be 2°, essentially giving the ellipse estimations at the foveal vision. A recent work examined the eccentricity dependency of color discrimination using a virtual reality device. Unsurprisingly, the discrimination ellipses grow in size as the eccentricity increases, because the human visual acuity drops sharply with eccentricity. The study also builds a computational model that predicts the ellipse shape given the test color and the eccentricity. The computational model is then used to wisely adjust pixel colors in the rendering pipeline to save display power, given that OLEDs power is strongly correlated with color. It is shown that one can save up to 20% of the display dynamic power without affecting the perceptual quality.

== Effects in colour theory ==
MacAdam's results confirmed earlier suspicions that colour difference could be measured using a metric in a chromaticity space. A number of attempts have been made to define a color space which is not as distorted as the CIE XYZ space. The most notable of these are the CIELUV and CIELAB color spaces. Although both of these spaces are less distorted than the CIE XYZ space, they are not completely free of distortion. This means that the MacAdam ellipses become nearly (but not exactly) circular in these spaces.

Using a Fisher information metric, da Fonseca et al. investigated the degree to which MacAdam ellipses can be derived from the response functions of the retinal photoreceptors. Using a three parameter model, it was demonstrated that photoreceptor absorption properties explain ≈ 87% of the variance of human color discrimination ability, as tested by previous behavioral experiments.

== See also ==
- Metric tensor
- Tissot's indicatrix, used to characterize distortions in map projections
- Mahalanobis distance, using covariance to create a metric
