= LCH =

LCH may refer to:

== Places ==
- County Hall, London, London, UK
- Lake Charles (Amtrak station), Louisiana, United States; Amtrak station code LCH
- Lake Charles Regional Airport, Lake Charles, Louisiana (IATA airport code)

== Companies & organizations ==
- Lexington Catholic High School, Lexington, Kentucky, United States
- LCH (clearing house), a financial infrastructure company

== Medicine ==
- Langerhans cell histiocytosis, a type of cancer
- Leydig cell hypoplasia, an intersex variation

== Military & aviation ==
- HAL Light Combat Helicopter
- Balikpapan-class landing craft heavy, officially known as Landing Craft, Heavy or LCH
- KAI LCH, Light Civil Helicopter of Korea Aerospace Industries (KAI)

== Science & technology ==
- Life-cycle hypothesis, a model of economic consumption
- Locally Compact Hausdorff space, a term used in mathematics
- HCL colour spaces, a category of colour space models also referred to as LCh
  - LCHab, an LCh representation of the CIELAB colour space
  - LCHuv, an LCh representation of the CIELUV colour space
