= Elliot Quincy Adams =

American scientist (1888–1971)

Elliot Quincy Adams (September 13, 1888 – March 12, 1971) was an American scientist. Chemist Gilbert N. Lewis remarked that "the two most profound scientific minds, among the people he had known, were those of E[lliot] Q Adams and Albert Einstein."

Adams was the son of Edward Perkins and Etta Medora (Elliot) Adams, and a descendant of John Adams, circa 1650 from Cambridge, Massachusetts. He graduated from Medford High School in Medford, Massachusetts, and attended the Massachusetts Institute of Technology, studying chemical engineering under Gilbert N. Lewis (1875–1946), and in 1909 earned his bachelor's degree in chemical engineering. After graduation, Adams took a position with the General Electric Research Laboratory in Schenectady, New York, where he worked with Irving Langmuir on problems dealing with heat transfer. In 1912 Adams supplied the simple mathematical formula that is used to describe the conduction-convection loss from an incandescent filament operated in a gaseous atmosphere, and in the same year moved to Berkeley, California, for doctoral studies at the University of California. In 1914 he earned his Ph.D.under the direction of Gilbert N. Lewis.

In 1917, Adams moved to Washington, D. C., to perform research in the Color Laboratory in the U.S. Department of Agriculture. From 1921-1949, when he retired, he worked for General Electric at Nela Park, East Cleveland, Ohio. He made a seminal contribution to color science in his 1942 paper, "X-Z planes in the 1931 I.C.I. system of colorimetry." In this paper, he provides two models for perceptually uniform color spaces. One, which he termed "chromatic value," was the precursor of the modern CIELAB uniform color space; the other, which he termed "chromatic valence," was the direct ancestor of the Hunter Lab color space, and provided the elements of today's CIELUV. This paper showed how relatively simple transformations from XYZ of Munsell colors can have relatively uniform spacing of hue and chroma.

Adams was a Fellow of the American Association for the Advancement of Science, American Physical Society, Mineralogical Society of America, and the Illuminating Engineering Society. In 1941, he was presented the Silver Beaver Award by the Boy Scouts of America. Perhaps his best recognized effort was the book, coauthored with W. E. Forsythe, titled Fluorescent and Other Gaseous Discharge Lamps.
