= Hunter Lab =

Color space defined by Richard S. Hunter

Hunter Lab (also known as Hunter L,a,b) is a color space defined in 1948 by Richard S. Hunter. It was designed to be computed via simple formulas from the CIEXYZ space, but to be more perceptually uniform. Hunter named his coordinates L, a and b. Hunter Lab was a precursor to CIELAB, created in 1976 by the International Commission on Illumination (CIE), which named the coordinates for CIELAB as L*, a*, b* to distinguish them from Hunter's coordinates.

== Formulation ==
L is a correlate of lightness and is computed from the Y tristimulus value using Priest's approximation to Munsell value:

$$L = 100\sqrt\frac{Y}{Y_\mathrm{n}}$$

where Y_{n} is the Y tristimulus value of a specified white object. For surface-color applications, the specified white object is usually (though not always) a hypothetical material with unit reflectance that follows Lambert's law. The resulting L will be scaled between 0 (black) and 100 (white); roughly ten times the Munsell value. Note that a medium lightness of 50 is produced by a luminance of 25, due to the square root proportionality.

a and b are termed opponent color axes. a represents, roughly, Redness (positive) versus Greenness (negative). It is computed as:

$$a = K_{\mathrm{a}}\left(\frac{\frac{X}{X_\mathrm{n}} - \frac{Y}{Y_\mathrm{n}}}{\sqrt{\frac{Y}{Y_\mathrm{n}}}}\right)$$

where K_{a} is a coefficient that depends upon the illuminant (for D65, K_{a} is 172.30; see approximate formula below) and X_{n} is the X tristimulus value of the specified white object.

The other opponent color axis, b, is positive for yellow colors and negative for blue colors. It is computed as:

$$b = K_{\mathrm{b}}\left(\frac{\frac{Y}{Y_\mathrm{n}} - \frac{Z}{Z_\mathrm{n}}}{\sqrt{\frac{Y}{Y_\mathrm{n}}}}\right)$$

where K_{b} is a coefficient that depends upon the illuminant (for D65, K_{b} is 67.20; see approximate formula below) and Z_{n} is the Z tristimulus value of the specified white object.

Both a and b will be zero for objects that have the same chromaticity coordinates as the specified white objects (i.e., achromatic, grey, objects).

== Approximate formulas for K_{a} and K_{b} ==
In the previous version of the Hunter Lab color space, K_{a} was 175 and K_{b} was 70. Hunter Associates Lab discovered that better agreement could be obtained with other color difference metrics, such as CIELAB (see above) by allowing these coefficients to depend upon the illuminants. Approximate formulae are:

$$K_{\mathrm{a}} \approx \frac{175}{198.04}(X_{\mathrm{n}} + Y_{\mathrm{n}})$$

$$K_{\mathrm{b}} \approx \frac{70}{218.11}(Y_{\mathrm{n}} + Z_{\mathrm{n}})$$

which result in the original values for Illuminant C, the original illuminant with which the Lab color space was used.

== As an Adams chromatic valence space ==
Adams chromatic valence color spaces are based on two elements: a (relatively) uniform lightness scale and a (relatively) uniform chromaticity scale. If we take as the uniform lightness scale Priest's approximation to the Munsell Value scale, which would be written in modern notation as:

$$L = 100\sqrt{\frac{Y}{Y_\mathrm{n}}}$$

and, as the uniform chromaticity coordinates:

$$c_\mathrm{a} = \frac{\frac{X}{X_\mathrm{n}}}{\frac{Y}{Y_\mathrm{n}}} - 1 = \frac{\frac{X}{X_\mathrm{n}} - \frac{Y}{Y_\mathrm{n}}}{\frac{Y}{Y_\mathrm{n}}}$$

$$c_\mathrm{b} = k_{\mathrm{e}} \left(1 - \frac{\frac{Z}{Z_\mathrm{n}}}{\frac{Y}{Y_\mathrm{n}}}\right) = k_\mathrm{e}\frac{\frac{Y}{Y_\mathrm{n}} - \frac{Z}{Z_\mathrm{n}}}{\frac{Y}{Y_\mathrm{n}}}$$

where k_{e} is a tuning coefficient, we obtain the two chromatic axes:

$$a = K\cdot L\cdot c_\mathrm{a} = K\cdot 100\frac{\frac{X}{X_\mathrm{n}} - \frac{Y}{Y_\mathrm{n}}}{\sqrt{\frac{Y}{Y_\mathrm{n}}}}$$

and

$$b = K\cdot L\cdot c_\mathrm{b} = K\cdot 100 k_\mathrm{e} \frac{\frac{Y}{Y_\mathrm{n}} - \frac{Z}{Z_\mathrm{n}}}{\sqrt{\frac{Y}{Y_\mathrm{n}}}}$$

which is identical to the Hunter Lab formulas given above if we select K = K_{a}/100 and k_{e} = K_{b}/K_{a}. Therefore, the Hunter Lab color space is an Adams chromatic valence color space.
