= Adams chromatic valence color space =

Adams chromatic valence color spaces are a class of color spaces suggested by Elliot Quincy Adams. Two important Adams chromatic valence spaces are CIELUV and Hunter Lab.

Chromatic value/valence spaces are notable for incorporating the opponent process model and the empirically-determined 2 1/2 factor in the red/green vs. blue/yellow chromaticity components (such as in CIELAB).

== Chromatic value ==
In 1942, Adams suggested chromatic value color spaces. Chromatic value, or chromance, refers to the intensity of the opponent process responses and is derived from Adams' theory of color vision.

A chromatic value space consists of three components:

- $V_Y,$ the Munsell–Sloan–Godlove value function: $V_Y^2 = 1.4742Y - 0.004743 Y^2;$
- $V_X - V_Y$, the red–green chromaticity dimension, where $V_X$ is the value function applied to $(y_n/x_n)X$ instead of Y;
- $V_Z - V_Y$, the blue–yellow chromaticity dimension, where $V_Z$ is the value function applied to $(y_n/z_n)Z$ instead of Y.

A chromatic value diagram is a plot of $V_X - V_Y$ (horizontal axis) against $0.4(V_Z - V_Y)$ (vertical axis). The 2 1/2 scale factor is intended to make radial distance from the white point correlate with the Munsell chroma along any one hue radius (i.e., to make the diagram perceptually uniform). For achromatic colors, $(y_n/x_n)X = Y = (y_n/z_n)Z,$ and hence $V_X - V_Y = 0,$ $V_Z - V_Y = 0.$ In other words, the white point is at the origin.

Constant differences along the chroma dimension did not appear different by a corresponding amount, so Adams proposed a new class of spaces, which he termed chromatic valence. These spaces have "nearly equal radial distances for equal changes in Munsell chroma".

== Chromance ==
In chromaticity scales, lightness is factored out, leaving two dimensions. Two lights with the same spectral power distribution, but different luminance, will have identical chromaticity coordinates. The familiar CIE (x, y) chromaticity diagram is very perceptually non-uniform: small perceptual changes in chromaticity in greens, for example, translate into large distances, while larger perceptual differences in chromaticity in other colors are usually much smaller.

Adams suggested a relatively simple uniform chromaticity scale in his 1942 paper:

$\frac{y_n}{x_n}X - Y$ and $\frac{y_n}{z_n}Z - Y,$

where $x_n, y_n, z_n$ are the chromaticities of the reference white object (the n suggests normalized). (Adams had used smoked magnesium oxide under CIE Illuminant C, but these would be considered obsolete today. This exposition is generalized from his papers.)

Objects which have the same chromaticity coordinates as the white object usually appear neutral, or fairly so, and normalizing in this fashion ensures that their coordinates lie at the origin. Adams plotted the first one the horizontal axis and the latter, multiplied by 0.4, on the vertical axis. The scaling factor is to ensure that the contours of constant chroma (saturation) lie on a circle. Distances along any radius from the origin are proportional to colorimetric purity.

The chromance diagram is not invariant to brightness, so Adams normalized each term by the Y tristimulus value:

$\frac{y_n}{x_n} \frac{X}{Y} = \frac{x/x_n}{y/y_n}$ and $\frac{y_n}{z_n} \frac{Z}{Y} = \frac{z/z_n}{y/y_n}.$

These expressions, he noted, depended only on the chromaticity of the sample. Accordingly, he called their plot a "constant-brightness chromaticity diagram". This diagram does not have the white point at the origin, but at (1, 1) instead.

== Chromatic valence ==
Chromatic valence spaces incorporate two relatively perceptually uniform elements: a chromaticity scale and a lightness scale. The lightness scale, determined using the Newhall–Nickerson–Judd value function, forms one axis of the color space:

$$Y = 1.2219V_J - 0.23111V_J^2 + 0.23951V_J^3 - 0.021009V_J^4 + 0.0008404V_J^5.$$

The remaining two axes are formed by multiplying the two uniform chromaticity coordinates by the lightness, V_{J}:

$$\frac{X/x_n}{Y/y_n} - 1 = \frac{X/x_n - Y/y_n}{Y/y_n},$$

$$\frac{Z/z_n}{Y/y_n} - 1 = \frac{Z/z_n - Y/y_n}{Y/y_n}.$$

This is essentially what Hunter used in his Lab color space. As with chromatic value, these functions are plotted with a scale factor of 2 1/2 to give nearly equal radial distance for equal changes in Munsell chroma.

== Color difference ==
Adams' color spaces rely on the Munsell value for lightness. Defining chromatic valence components $W_X=\left(\frac{x/x_n}{y/y_n}-1\right) V_J$ and $W_Z= \left(\frac{z/z_n}{y/y_n}-1\right)V_J$, we can determine the difference between two colors as:

$$\Delta E=\sqrt{(0.5 \Delta V_J)^2+(\Delta W_X)^2 + (0.4 \Delta W_Z)^2}$$

where V_{J} is the Newhall-Nickerson-Judd value function and the 0.4 factor is incorporated to better make differences in W_{X} and W_{Z} perceptually correspond to one another.

In chromatic value color spaces, the chromaticity components are $W_X=V_X-V_Y$ and $W_Z=V_Z-V_Y$. The difference is:

$$\Delta E=\sqrt{(0.23 \Delta V_Y)^2+(\Delta W_X)^2 + (0.4 \Delta W_Z)^2}$$

where the Munsell-Sloan-Godlove value function is applied to the tristimulus value indicated in the subscript. (Note that the two spaces use different lightness approximations.)
