= Richard S. Hunter =

American color scientist (1909–1991)

Richard Sewall Hunter (1909–1991) was a pioneering American color scientist and founder of Hunter Associates Laboratory (HunterLab). He is best known as the inventor in 1942 of the Hunter L,a,b color measurement system the precursor to the CIELAB color space. Hunter was awarded the David Richardson Medal in 1971 by the Optical Society.

== Biography ==
Richard Hunter was born in Washington, D.C., on October 25, 1909, and lived his entire life in northern Virginia. He graduated from the former McKinley Technical High School in Washington, DC in 1927 and later that summer took the US Civil Service exam. He was offered employment in December 1927 as a "minor Laboratory apprentice" in the colorimetry section of what was then the National Bureau of Standards (now National Institute of Standards and Technology), working with pioneers in the color measurement field like Irwin Priest and Drs. Deane B. Judd and Kason S. Gibson, to define the human eye's response to color. At night he attended The George Washington University and, after additional studies at Johns Hopkins University and Massachusetts Institute of Technology, he graduated from GWU in 1937.

In 1931, after work done by NBS and other organizations around the world, The International Commission on Illumination (abbreviated CIE for its French name, Commission internationale de l'éclairage) adopted the Y,X,Z color space to numerically define the human eye's, three dimensional response to color. Expressed as three numbers between zero and about 110 for Y and X, and 175 for Z, it was difficult for a layperson to comprehend. In the late 1930s Richard developed a mathematical transformation of X,Y,Z, to the Hunter α, β scale, (published in NBS Circular C429, July 30, 1942) which evolved in 1948 into the Rd, a, b, scale and became the now familiar Hunter L,a,b scale in 1958. The L,a,b color scale ("L" for lightness, zero to 100, "a" for red-green, roughly +50 to -50, and "b" for blue-yellow, again roughly -50 to +50) is much easier for a non-scientist to visualize and continues to be widely used by industry throughout the world today. He also designed the tristimulus colorimeter instrument to make the scale easily usable by industry.

In 1946, after WW II work on, among other things, aimable signaling mirrors (for aircraft survival kits, the previous ones had no way for the user to see where the flash was going, his design was included in the Apollo Moon landing survival kits) and aerial flares, he left the Bureau to join Gardner Laboratories where he had previously worked part-time, after hours designing many commercial instruments for the measurement of color and appearance.

Roughly 6 years later, in August 1952, he resigned from Gardner and opened Hunter Associates Laboratory, universally known as HunterLab (he used the L,a,b scale in the name) October 1, 1952. HunterLab’s beginnings were very modest – just Richard and 2 technicians working in four rooms on the second floor of his boyhood home (which was next door to his house) in the woods in what is now McLean, VA. Several months later his wife, Elizabeth, joined the company to take care of administration and finance (while the family German Shepherd slept on the front porch).

His first contracts were for consulting and testing projects, for example, measuring the appearance of roofing granules for Funkhouser Co. These projects soon led to requests for an instrument to implement his work. In 1954 he developed a tubiditimeter for measuring the amount of wood fiber in paper mill wastewater and a yellowness meter for measuring the vitamin A content of milk. Over the years he designed instruments to help USDA score tomato puree for Grade A rating, a citrus colorimeter for grading frozen orange juice for the Florida Citrus Commission, gloss meters, a distinctness of image meter, an on-line colorimeter, and many other color and appearance measuring instruments. The most successful was the 25th development project, undertaken in 1957 for the Procter & Gamble Company who didn't want the Crisco they were measuring to melt and run into the instrument as was happening with their then current unit. After evaluating the prototype D25 Tristimulus Colorimeter, P&G ordered 26. Over the next 30 years more than 5,000 D25s were sold before it was superseded in 1987 by the spectrophotometric based LabScan.

When P&G ordered their 26 units, HunterLab added manufacturing to its consulting, testing and education mission and this stimulated growth over the following years. To accommodate that growth, in 1965 the company moved to a larger building in Fairfax, VA and then Reston, VA in 1979 where it continues to manage its worldwide presence today.

Richard Hunter had a long list of achievements during a career that spanned over 60 years. In addition to conceiving the L,a,b color scale and its companion Delta E (color difference) scale, he developed the first practical photoelectric tristimulus colorimeter that made his L,a,b, color scale easily usable by industry and authored the textbook, The Measurement of Color and Appearance, published in 1975 (revised with Richard Harold in 1987). He was an active member of many organizations, including American Society for Testing Materials (ASTM); The Optical Society of America (OSA); The Inter Society Color Council (ISCC), Technical Association of the Pulp and Paper Industry (TAPPI) and the Federation of Societies for Coatings Technology to name a few. He chaired numerous committees and served as president and board member of the ISCC from 1972 to 1974.

He received the first of the 16 patents bearing his name in January 1935 (then representing Gardner Laboratory) for a "Gloss Measuring Device". His last patent was issued in December 1972.

In the mid 1970s the Congress created the Employee Stock Ownership Program (ESOP) as a retirement program that allowed a company to buy its own stock and give it to the ESOP (which held it for the employees until they retired). As the term “Associates” in Hunter Associates Laboratory implies, Hunter had the vision that the employees should have a stake in the company but, prior to the ESOP being added to the tax code, there was no practical way to do this. Taking advantage of the new program, he created the HunterLab ESOP in 1977. In 2015 HunterLab acquired the last of the outstanding shares and is now 100% employee owned.

In 1982 Hunter began work on the ASTM publication - Compilation of Color and Appearance Standards. The first edition was published in 1984, a second in 1987. He was reviewing the nearly final draft of the Third Edition in December 1990, just before he died.

His awards and recognitions include the ISCC Godlove Award ('91 posthumously); The ASTM Award of Merit (1961); ASTM Fellow; The Bruning Award of the Federation of Societies for Coatings Technology (1962);The Richardson Award from the Optical Society of America (1970); A Fellow of OSA; The ISCC Macbeth Award (1976). The ASTM Executive Subcommittee of Committee E12 on Color and Appearance created the Richard S. Hunter Award to honor and recognize those individuals who exemplify the personal and professional characteristics displayed by Mr. Richard Hunter.

Typifying his lifelong interest in education, in 1982 Richard and Elizabeth Hunter made a gift to the Rochester Institute of Technology to establish the Richard S. Hunter Professorship of Color Science, Appearance and Technology. The chair is currently held by Dr. Roy Berns.

He died on January 16, 1991, at Arlington Hospital from complications related to Parkinson's Disease.
