= Oklab color space =

Standard color space with color-opponent values

Oklab and Oklch
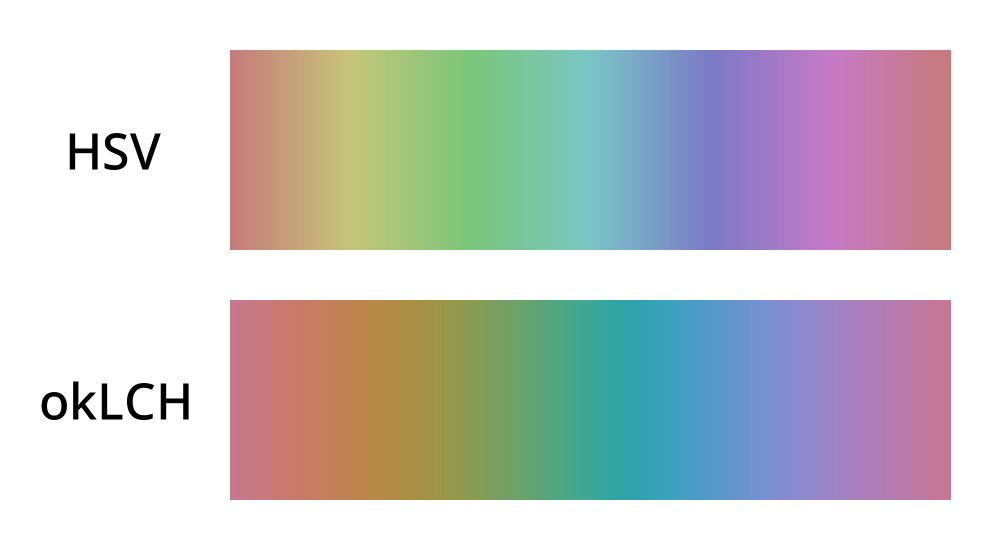
- Irregular perceptual lightness in a gradient generated with constant value in HSV space, with light yellows and dark blues, compared to one generated with constant lightness in Oklch
- Status: Recommendation draft
- First published: 23 December 2020
- Latest version: 13 February 2024
- Preview version: 29 February 2024
- Organization: W3C
- Committee: CSS Working Group
- Series: CSS Color
- Predecessor: CIELAB color space
- Domain: Color model
- License: Public domain
- Website: www.w3.org

The Oklab color space is a uniform color space for device-independent color designed to improve perceptual uniformity, hue and lightness prediction, color blending, (Note: However, it is not suitable for image blending or processing, for which the gamma-expanded linear RGB color space is more appropriate.) and usability while ensuring numerical stability and ease of implementation. Introduced by Björn Ottosson in December 2020, Oklab and its cylindrical counterpart, Oklch, have been included in the CSS Color Level 4 and Level 5 drafts for device-independent web colors since December 2021. They are supported by recent versions of major web browsers and allow the specification of colors within the DCI-P3 gamut but outside sRGB.

Oklab's model is fitted with improved color appearance data: CAM16 data for lightness and chroma, and IPT data for hue. The new fit addresses issues such as unexpected hue and lightness changes in blue colors present in the CIELAB color space, simplifying the creation of color schemes and smoother color gradients.

As Ottosson explained, he chose the name Oklab because the model does an OK (adequate) job and is based on the three color-space coordinates L, a, and b.

== Coordinates ==
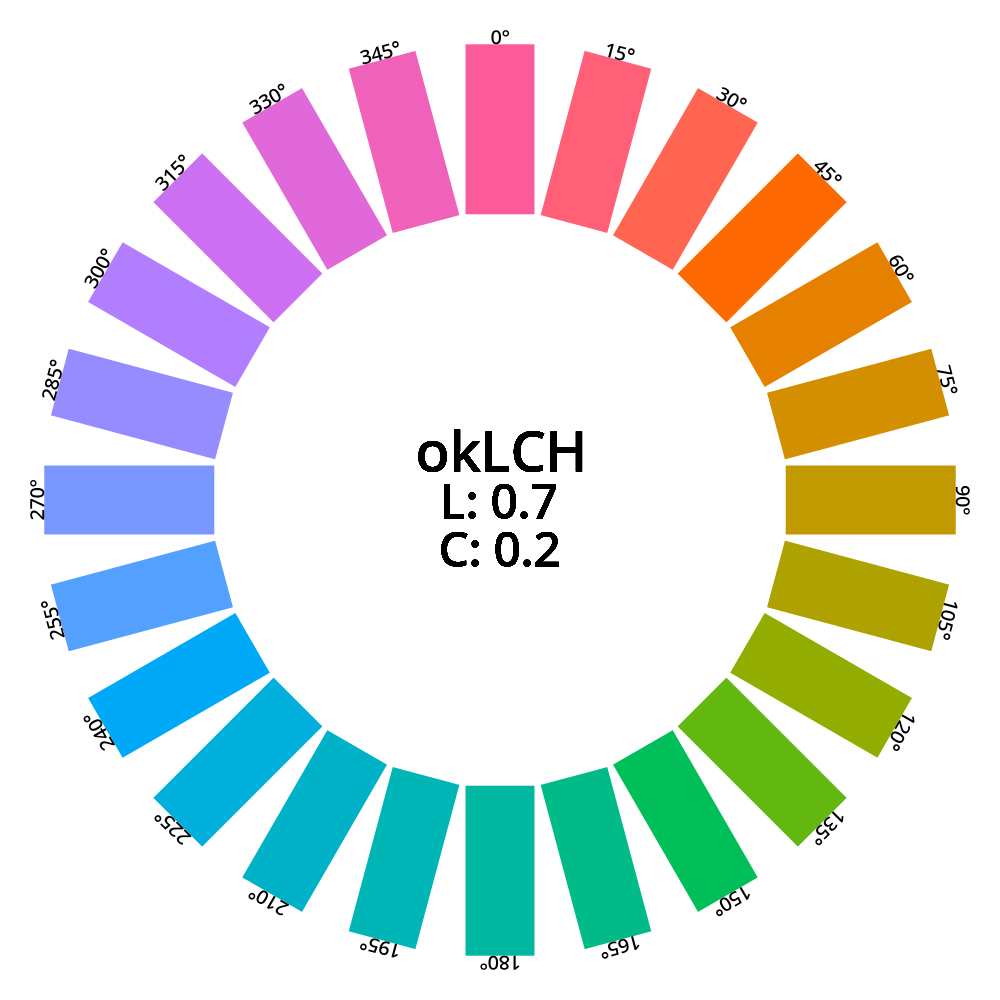
Oklch color wheel

Oklab uses the same spatial structure as CIELAB, representing color using three components:

- L for perceptual lightness, ranging from 0 (pure black) to 1 (reference white, if achromatic), often denoted as a percentage
- a and b for opponent channels of the four unique hues, unbounded but in practice ranging from −0.5 to +0.5; CSS assigns ±100% to ±0.4 for both
  - a for green (negative) to red (positive)
  - b for blue (negative) to yellow (positive)

Like CIELCh, Oklch represents colors using:

- L for perceptual lightness
- C for chroma representing chromatic intensity, with values from 0 (achromatic) with no upper limit, but in practice not exceeding +0.5; CSS treats +0.4 as 100%
- h for hue angle in a color wheel, typically denoted in decimal degrees

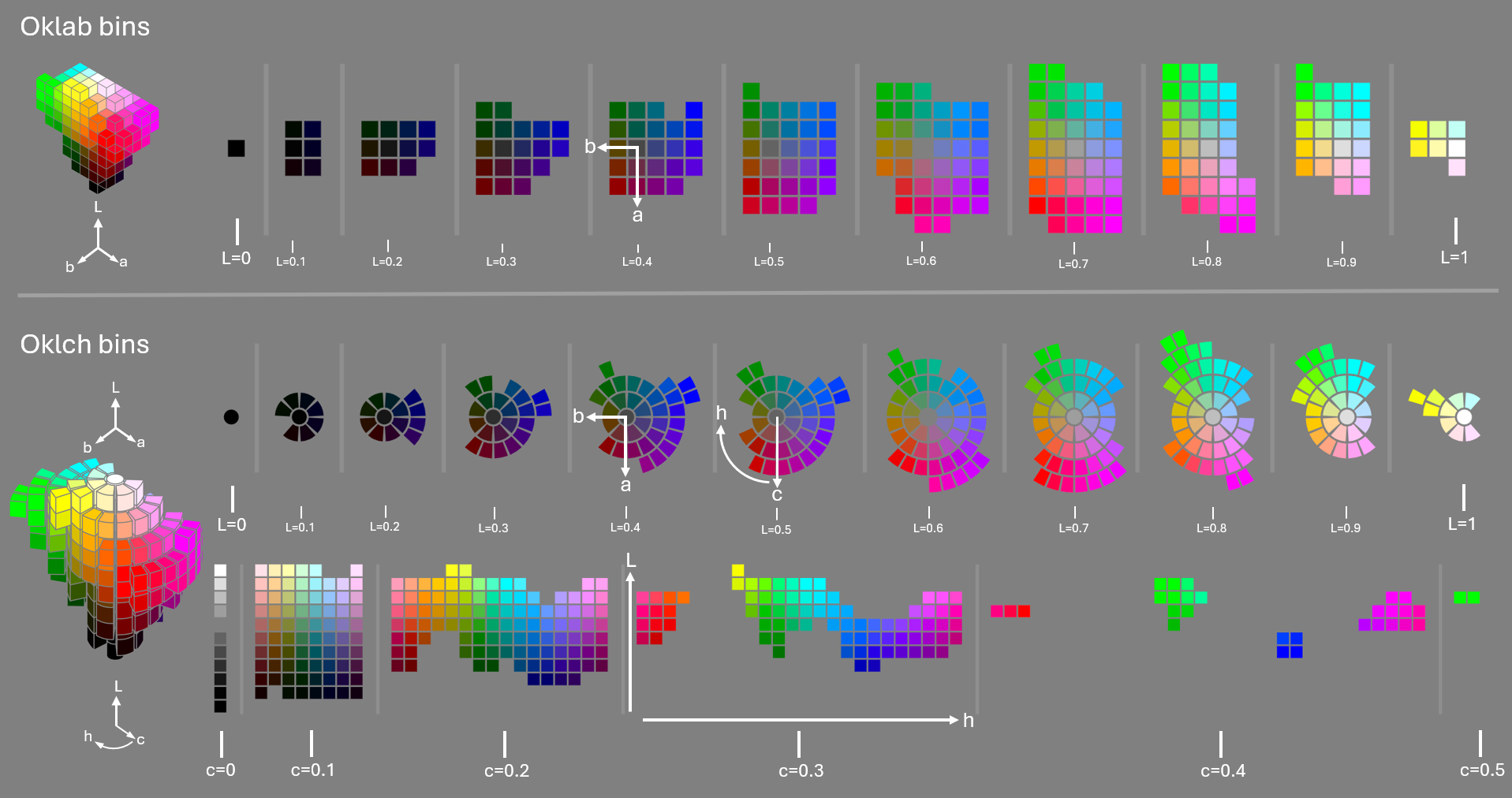
Oklab vs. Oklch color spaces. The color bins shown are the ones within the Rec. 2020 gamut (a wide gamut RGB).

=== Achromatic colors ===
Neutral greys, pure black and the reference white are achromatic, that is, $a = 0$, $b = 0$, $C = 0$, and h is undefined. Assigning any real value to their hue component has no effect on conversions between color spaces.

=== Color differences ===
The perceptual color difference in Oklab is calculated as the Euclidean distance between the (L, a, b) coordinates.

== Conversions between color spaces ==
=== Conversion to and from Oklch ===
Like CIELCh, the Cartesian coordinates a and b are converted to the polar coordinates C and h as follows:
$$\begin{align}
C &= \sqrt{a^2 + b^2}, \\
h &= \operatorname{atan2}(b, a),
\end{align}$$
and the polar coordinates are converted to the Cartesian coordinates as follows:
$$\begin{align}
a &= C \cos h, \\
b &= C \sin h.
\end{align}$$

=== Conversion from CIE XYZ ===
Converting from CIE XYZ with a Standard Illuminant D65 involves:

1. Applying the linear map which converts the XYZ values into a space analogous to the LMS color space: (Note: The (l, m, s) space used here is not the same as the LMS color space, but rather an arbitrary space that was found numerically to best fit the color appearance data.)
  $$\begin{bmatrix} l \\ m \\ s \end{bmatrix} =
\mathbf M_1
\begin{bmatrix} X \\ Y \\ Z \end{bmatrix}.$$
2. Applying a cube root non-linearity:
  $$\begin{bmatrix} l' \\ m' \\ s' \end{bmatrix} =
\begin{bmatrix} l^{1/3} \\ m^{1/3} \\ s^{1/3} \end{bmatrix}.$$
3. Converting to Oklab with another linear map:
  $$\begin{bmatrix} L \\ a \\ b \end{bmatrix} =
\mathbf M_2
\begin{bmatrix} l' \\ m' \\ s' \end{bmatrix}.$$

The linear-map matrices are
$$\begin{align}
\mathbf M_1 &= \begin{bmatrix}
0.8189330101 & \phantom{-}0.3618667424 & -0.1288597137 \\
0.0329845436 & \phantom{-}0.9293118715 & \phantom{-}0.0361456387 \\
0.0482003018 & \phantom{-}0.2643662691 & \phantom{-}0.6338517070
\end{bmatrix}, \\
\mathbf M_2 &= \begin{bmatrix}
0.2104542553 & \phantom{-}0.7936177850 & -0.0040720468 \\
1.9779984951 & -2.4285922050 & \phantom{-}0.4505937099 \\
0.0259040371 & \phantom{-}0.7827717662 & -0.8086757660
\end{bmatrix}.
\end{align}$$

=== Conversion from sRGB ===
Visualization of linear color values mapping to locations in perceptual color spaces

Converting from sRGB requires first converting from sRGB to CIE XYZ with a Standard Illuminant D65. As the last step of this conversion is a linear map from linear RGB to CIE XYZ, the reference implementation directly employs the multiplied matrix representing the composition of the two linear maps:
$$\begin{bmatrix} l \\ m \\ s \end{bmatrix} =
\begin{bmatrix}
0.4122214708 & 0.5363325363 & 0.0514459929 \\
0.2119034982 & 0.6806995451 & 0.1073969566 \\
0.0883024619 & 0.2817188376 & 0.6299787005
\end{bmatrix}
\begin{bmatrix} R_\text{linear} \\ G_\text{linear} \\ B_\text{linear} \end{bmatrix}.$$

=== Conversion to CIE XYZ and sRGB ===
Converting to CIE XYZ and sRGB simply involves applying the respective inverse functions in reverse order:
$$\begin{align}
\begin{bmatrix} l' \\ m' \\ s' \end{bmatrix} &= \mathbf M_2^{-1} \begin{bmatrix} L \\ a \\ b \end{bmatrix}, \\
\begin{bmatrix} l \\ m \\ s \end{bmatrix} &= \begin{bmatrix} (l')^3 \\ (m')^3 \\ (s')^3 \end{bmatrix}, \\
\begin{bmatrix} X \\ Y \\ Z \end{bmatrix} &= \mathbf M_1^{-1} \begin{bmatrix} l \\ m \\ s \end{bmatrix}.
\end{align}$$
