= HCL color space =

Color space model

HCL (hue–chroma–luminance) or LCh refers to any of the many cylindrical color space models that are designed to accord with human perception of color with the three parameters. Lch has been adopted by information visualization practitioners to present data without the bias implicit in using varying saturation. They are, in general, designed to have characteristics of both cylindrical translations of the RGB color space, such as HSL and HSV, and the L*a*b* color space.

The sRGB gamut plotted within the cylindrical CIELCh color spaces. L is the vertical axis; C is the cylinder radius; h is the angle around the circumference. Left: CIELCh_{ab}; right: CIELCh_{uv}

== Derivation ==
=== Color-making attributes ===
HCL concerns the following attributes of color appearance:

Hue
The "attribute of a visual sensation according to which an area appears to be similar to one of the perceived colors: red, yellow, green, and blue, or to a combination of two of them".
Lightness, value
The "brightness relative to the brightness of a similarly illuminated white".
Luminance (Y or L_{v,Ω})
The radiance weighted by the effect of each wavelength on a typical human observer, measured in SI units in candela per square meter (cd/m^{2}). Often the term luminance is used for the relative luminance, Y/Y_{n}, where Y_{n} is the luminance of the reference white point.
Colorfulness
The "attribute of a visual sensation according to which the perceived color of an area appears to be more or less chromatic".

The HSL and HSV color spaces are more intuitive translations of the RGB color space, because they provide a single hue number. However, their luminance variation does not match the way humans perceive color. Perceptually uniform color spaces outperform RGB in cases such as high noise environments.

=== CIE color spaces ===
CIE-based LCh color spaces are transformations of the two chroma values (ab or uv) into the polar coordinate. The source color spaces are still very well-regarded for their uniformity, and the transformation does not cause degradation in this aspect.

=== Sarifuddin, 2005 ===
Sarifuddin, noting the lack of blue hue consistency of CIELAB—a common complaint among its users— decided to make their own color space by mashing up some of the features.

=== Other color appearance models ===
In general, any color appearance model with a lightness and two chroma components can also be transformed into a HCL-type color space by turning the chroma components into polar coordinates.
