= Panasonic DP-UB820 =

2018 Blu-ray player

- Manufacturer: Panasonic
- Product family: UB
- Type: Media player
- Released: August 1, 2018
- Media: Ultra HD Blu-ray
- Dimensions: 430 mm x 62 mm x 208 mm
- Weight: Approx. 2.4 kg (5.3 lbs)
- Predecessor: DMP-UB900

The Panasonic DP-UB820 is Panasonic's Ultra HD Blu-ray player released in 2018.

== Features ==
UB820 is one of the first players to support the HDR10+ format (along with UB320, UB420 and UB9000) and the first player to offer onboard tone mapping for high dynamic range (HDR) and standard dynamic range (SDR) playback. Compared to the Panasonic's previous higher-end UB900 model, UB820 lacks touch-sensitive controls and THX certification. Unlike Magnetar UDP800, UB820 lacks the ability to play MKV files with full audio resolution.

== Reception ==
Sound & Vision said the player "offers reference-level video performance and also sets a new bar for HDR playback with both HDR flat-panel TVs and projectors." What Hi-Fi? wrote: "[...] DP-UB820EB has stood the test of time remaining our go-to recommendation for a 4K Blu-ray player that won't blow the budget." TechRadar summarized: "It's built to last and even though it is a few years old, it's still one of the standard bearers for what a 4K Blu-ray player should be." It was chosen by TechRadar, T3, and Wired as "the best 4K Blu-ray player for most people". Wirecutter named it the best 4K Blu-ray player but said the user interface is "slow by 2024 standards and isn’t very easy on the eyes." Comparing it to the cheaper DP-UB420 model, Polygon said that "It’s basically identical to the UB420, except it’s faster, and it supports Dolby Vision HDR". In 2023, Tom's Guide called it "the least-expensive Dolby Vision-capable 4K Blu-ray player with a decent reputation." In 2024, they called UB820-K the second-best 4K Blu-ray player after Oppo UDP-203.
