= Panasonic DP-UB9000 =

- Manufacturer: Panasonic
- Product family: UB
- Type: Media player
- Released: November 2018
- Media: Ultra HD Blu-ray
- Dimensions: 430 x 300 x 81 mm
- Weight: 7.8kg

The Panasonic DP-UB9000 is Panasonic's Ultra HD Blu-ray player released in 2018. It is Panasonic's flagship disc player model. The player was announced in February 2018 and released in November 2018.

== Features ==
The player supports HDR10+ and Dolby Vision high-dynamic-range standards. It doesn't support Super Audio CD and DVD-Audio formats. Unlike other high-end players like Magnetar UDP900, the UB9000 features custom tone mapping options.

== Reception ==
Sound & Vision called the UB9000 "unequalled by any other video disc player on the market." What Hi-Fi? said: "If you own a surround system that can make the most of the Panasonic DP-UB9000’s many talents, you won’t be disappointed." TechRadar said that "after Oppo's collapse, the Panasonic DP-UB9000 is a more than adequate replacement." Comparing it to the mid-range UB820 and the entry-level UB154, TechRadar said UB9000 has the best picture quality and the most effective upscaling of the three. They also named it the best premium 4K Blu-ray player. TechHive praised the image and build quality but called the out-of-the box audio playback "overly clinical".
