= Magnetar UDP900 =

- Manufacturer: Magnetar
- Product family: UDP
- Type: Media player
- Released: 2023
- Media: Ultra HD Blu-ray
- Dimensions: 445 x 321 x 123 mm
- Weight: 15.8kg
- Predecessor: Magnetar UDP800

The Magnetar UDP900 is Magnetar's Ultra HD Blu-ray player released in 2023. It is Magnetar's second player after Magnetar UDP800.

== Features ==
The player supports HDR10+ and Dolby Vision high-dynamic-range standards. Two USB ports are included, USB 2.0 port on the front, and USB 3.0 port at the back. The player has a built-in ES9038Pro stereo DAC by ESS Technology. Unlike the Panasonic DP-UB9000, UDP900 doesn't feature custom tone mapping options.

== Reception ==
Home Cinema Choice said: "You might not make use of all its features, and might hanker for a more robust disc tray, but I can't imagine any who acquire one will be disappointed." Digital Trends praised the audio and video fidelity, and build quality but criticized the dated software and expensive price. TechRadar noted it as the world's most expensive 4K Blu-ray player. Trusted Reviews summarized: "The Magnetar UDP900 achieves its goal of being the ultimate 4K Blu-ray player with flawless video and the kind of audiophile analogue performance to rival the best Hi-Fi disc-spinners." They listed it as the best high-end 4K Blu-ray player.
