= Magnetar UDP800 =

- Manufacturer: Magnetar
- Product family: UDP
- Type: Media player
- Released: December 2022
- Media: Ultra HD Blu-ray
- Dimensions: 430 mm x 300 mm x 90 mm
- Weight: 6.8kg
- Successor: UDP900

The Magnetar UDP800, released in 2022, is Magnetar's first Ultra HD Blu-ray player. Magnetar released a second, higher-end player, the UDP900, in 2023.

== Features ==
The UDP800 plays Super Audio CDs and is able to play DVDs of any region and Blu-rays of any zone without any modification being required. It supports HDR10+ and Dolby Vision high-dynamic-range standards. External hard drives of up to 16 terabytes can be accommodated. The player has a built-in Burr-Brown stereo DAC.

== Reception ==
TechRadar and Sound & Vision praised the build quality and audio capabilities of the UDP800 but noted the lack of Wi-Fi and streaming apps. TechRadar later noted it as "the best 4K Blu-ray player for audiophiles". Trusted Reviews said the remote "is a mass of tiny and nearly identical buttons, so even with the backlight it’s nearly impossible to use in a darkened home cinema." Sound & Vision also noted it as "horrible". TechHive said the player delivers "exquisite experiences with both music and movies." Home Cinema Choice's verdict was: "Audio and video quality is superb, and build quality is unbeatable." The player received a Red Dot Design Award in 2023. Trusted Reviews listed it as the best universal 4K Blu-ray player.
